= Burke–Schumann flame =

Type of flame

In combustion, a Burke–Schumann flame is a type of diffusion flame, established at the mouth of the two concentric ducts, by issuing fuel and oxidizer from the two region respectively. It is named after S.P. Burke and T.E.W. Schumann, who were able to predict the flame height and flame shape using their simple analysis of infinitely fast chemistry (which is now called as Burke–Schumann limit) in 1928 at the First symposium on combustion.

== Mathematical description ==
Consider a cylindrical duct with axis along $z$ direction with radius $a$ through which fuel is fed from the bottom and the tube mouth is located at $z=0$. Oxidizer is fed along the same axis, but in the concentric tube of radius $b$ outside the fuel tube. Let the mass fraction in the fuel tube be $Y_{Fo}$ and the mass fraction of the oxygen in the outside duct be $Y_{Oo}$. Fuel and oxygen mixing occurs in the region $z>0$. The following assumptions were made in the analysis:

- The average velocity is parallel to axis ($z$ direction) of the ducts, $\mathbf{v}= v \mathbf{e}_z$
- The mass flux in the axial direction is constant, $\rho v=\mathrm{constant}$
- Axial diffusion is negligible compared to the transverse/radial diffusion
- The flame occurs infinitely fast (Burke–Schumann limit), therefore flame appears as a reaction sheet across which properties of flow changes
- Effects of gravity has been neglected

Consider a one-step irreversible Arrhenius law, $\mathrm{Fuel}+s\mathrm{O}_2\rightarrow (1+s)\mathrm{Products}+q$, where $s$ is the mass of oxygen required to burn unit mass of fuel and $q$ is the amount of heat released per unit mass of fuel burned. If $\omega$ is the mass of fuel burned per unit volume per unit time and introducing the non-dimensional fuel and mass fraction and the Stoichiometry parameter,

$$y_F = \frac{Y_F}{Y_{Fo}},\quad y_O = \frac{Y_O}{Y_{Oo}},\quad S = \frac{sY_{Fo}}{Y_{Oo}}$$

the governing equations for fuel and oxidizer mass fraction reduce to

$$\begin{align}
\frac{\rho D_T}{r}\frac{\partial}{\partial r}\left(r\frac{\partial y_F}{\partial r}\right) - \rho v\frac{\partial y_F}{\partial z} = \frac{\omega}{Y_{Fo}} \\
\frac{\rho D_T}{r}\frac{\partial}{\partial r}\left(r\frac{\partial y_O}{\partial r}\right) - \rho v\frac{\partial y_O}{\partial z} = S\frac{\omega}{Y_{Fo}} \\
\end{align}$$

where Lewis number of both species is assumed to be unity and $\rho D_T$ is assumed to be constant, where $D_T$ is the thermal diffusivity. The boundary conditions for the problem are

$$\begin{align}
\text{at}\, &z=0,\, 0<r<a,\, y_F=1,\, y_O=0,\\
\text{at}\, &z=0,\, a<r<b,\, y_F=0,\, y_O=1,\\
\text{at}\, &r=b,\, 0<z<\infty,\, \frac{\partial y_F}{\partial r}=0,\, \frac{\partial y_O}{\partial r}=0.
\end{align}$$

The equation can be linearly combined to eliminate the non-linear reaction term $\omega/Y_{Fo}$ and solve for the new variable

$$Z = \frac{Sy_F-y_O+1}{S+1}$$,

where $Z$ is known as the mixture fraction. The mixture fraction takes the value of unity in the fuel stream and zero in the oxidizer stream and it is a scalar field which is not affected by the reaction. The equation satisfied by $Z$ is

$$\frac{1}{r}\frac{\partial}{\partial r}\left(r\frac{\partial Z}{\partial r}\right) - \frac{\rho v}{\rho D_T}\frac{\partial Z}{\partial z}=0$$

(If the Lewis numbers of fuel and oxidizer are not equal to unity, then the equation satisfied by $Z$ is nonlinear as follows from Shvab–Zeldovich–Liñán formulation). Introducing the following coordinate transformation

$$\xi = \frac{r}{b}, \quad \eta = \frac{\rho D_T}{\rho v} \frac{z}{b^2}, \quad c= \frac{a}{b}$$

reduces the equation to

$$\frac{1}{\xi}\frac{\partial}{\partial \xi}\left(\xi\frac{\partial Z}{\partial \xi}\right) - \frac{\partial Z}{\partial \eta}=0.$$

The corresponding boundary conditions become

$$\begin{align}
\text{at}\, &\eta=0,\, 0<\xi<c,\, Z=1,\\
\text{at}\, &\eta=0,\, c<\xi<1,\, Z=0,\\
\text{at}\, &\xi=1,\, 0<\eta<\infty,\, \frac{\partial Z}{\partial \xi}=0.
\end{align}$$

The equation can be solved by separation of variables

$$Z(\xi,\eta) = c^2 + 2c \sum_{n=1}^\infty \frac{1}{\lambda_n} \frac{J_1(c\lambda_n)}{J_0^2(\lambda_n)} J_0(\lambda_n \xi)e^{-\lambda_n^2\eta}$$

where $J_0$ and $J_1$ are the Bessel function of the first kind and $\lambda_n$ is the nth root of $J_1(\lambda)=0.$ Solution can also be obtained for the planar ducts instead of the axisymmetric ducts discussed here.

== Flame shape and height ==
In the Burke-Schumann limit, the flame is considered as a thin reaction sheet outside which both fuel and oxygen cannot exist together, i.e., $y_Fy_O=0$. The reaction sheet itself is located by the stoichiometric surface where $Sy_F=y_O$, in other words, where

$$Z=Z_s \equiv \frac{1}{S+1}$$

where $Z_s$ is the stoichiometric mixture fraction. The reaction sheet separates fuel and oxidizer region. The inner structure of the reaction sheet is described by Liñán's equation. On the fuel side of the reaction sheet ($Z>Z_s$)

$$y_F = \frac{Z-Z_s}{1-Z_s},\, y_O=0$$

and on the oxidizer side ($Z<Z_s$)

$$y_F=0,\, y_O = 1-\frac{Z}{Z_s}.$$

For given values of $Z_s$ (or, $S$) and $c$, the flame shape is given by the condition $Z(\xi,\eta)=Z_s$, i.e.,

$$Z_s=c^2 + 2c \sum_{n=1}^\infty \frac{1}{\lambda_n} \frac{J_1(c\lambda_n)}{J_0^2(\lambda_n)} J_0(\lambda_n \xi)e^{-\lambda_n^2\eta}.$$

When $Z_s\rightarrow 0$ ($S\rightarrow \infty$), the flame extends from the mouth of the inner tube and attaches itself to the outer tube at a certain height (under-ventilated case) and when $Z_s\rightarrow 1$ ($S\rightarrow 0$), the flame starts from the mouth of the inner tube and joins at the axis at some height away from the mouth (over-ventilated case). In general, the flame height is obtained by solving for $\eta$ in the above equation after setting $\xi=1$ for the under-ventilated case and $\xi=0$ for the over-ventilated case.

Since flame heights are generally large for the exponential terms in the series to be negligible, as a first approximation flame height can be estimated by keeping only the first term of the series. This approximation predicts flame heights for both cases as follows

$$\begin{align}
\eta &= \frac{1}{\lambda_1^2}\ln \left[\frac{2c J_1(c\lambda_1)}{(Z_s-c^2)\lambda_1 J_0(\lambda_1)}\right],\quad \text{under-ventilated} \\
\eta &= \frac{1}{\lambda_1^2}\ln \left[\frac{2c J_1(c\lambda_1)}{(Z_s-c^2)\lambda_1 J_0^2(\lambda_1)}\right],\quad \text{over-ventilated},
\end{align}$$

where $\lambda_1=3.8317.$
