= Amable Liñán =

Spanish aeronautical engineer (1934–2025)

Excelentísimo Señor Don Amable Liñán
- Born: Amable Liñán Martínez; 27 November 1934; Castrillo de Cabrera, León, Spain
- Died: 8 November 2025 (aged 90); Madrid, Spain
- Education: Technical University of Madrid; California Institute of Technology
- Known for: Liñán's diffusion flame theory Activation energy asymptotics Liñán's equation Liñán's mixture fraction Shvab–Zeldovich–Liñán formulation Crespo–Liñán correction Liñán's flame speed Clavin–Liñán model Zeldovich–Liñán–Dold model Liñán's similarity solution Edge flames Liñán's recommendation
- Scientific career
- Fields: Combustion; Fluid Mechanics; Aerospace Engineering
- Workplaces: University of California, San Diego; Yale University; University of Michigan; Princeton University; Stanford University; Aix-Marseille University; Pierre and Marie Curie University; Technical University of Madrid
- Thesis: On the structure of laminar diffusion flames (1963)
- Doctoral advisor: Gregorio Millán Barbany; Frank E. Marble

Amable Liñán Martínez (27 November 1934 – 8 November 2025) was a Spanish aeronautical engineer working in the field of combustion and fluid mechanics.

== Life and career ==
Liñán was born in the remote village of Noceda de Cabrera, as the seventh child of a cattle dealer. He completed his secondary education at the Colegio Marista San José in León and later moved to Madrid to study Aeronautical Engineering at the Polytechnic University of Madrid

Liñán held a PhD in Aeronautical Engineering from the Technical University of Madrid, advised by Gregorio Millán Barbany and Degree of Aeronautical Engineer from the Caltech advised by Frank E. Marble.

He was Professor of Fluid Mechanics and professor emeritus at the Higher Technical School of Aeronautical Engineers of the Polytechnic University of Madrid (attached to the Department of Propulsion and Thermofluidodynamics of said school). Liñán taught at universities in California, Michigan and Princeton University in the United States and in Marseilles in France, among others. From 1997, he was an adjunct professor at Yale University.

Liñán died on 8 November 2025, at the age of 90.

== Research ==
Liñán focused his research studies on the basic problems of combustion, both reactor and planetary probe dynamics, in the latter case working directly for NASA and the European Space Agency.

The diffusion flame structure in counterflow was analyzed by him in 1974 through activation-energy asymptotics.

== Publications ==
Liñán was the author of several books and scientific research.

- Paul Clavin; Amable Liñán (1984). Theory of gaseous combustion.
- Paul C. Fife; Amable Liñán; Forman A. Williams, eds. (1991). Dynamical Issues in Combustion Theory. Springer. ISBN 978-1461269571.
- Amable Liñán; Forman A. Williams (1993). Fundamental Aspects of Combustion. Oxford University Press. ISBN 978-0195076264.
- J. I. Diaz; M. A. Herrero; Amable Liñán; J. L. Vazquez, eds. (1995). Free boundary problems: theory and applications. Taylor & Francis. ISBN 978-0582256453.

== Honors ==
In 1989, he was elected member of the Royal Academy of Exact, Physical and Natural Sciences. He was also a member of the Royal Academy of Engineering of Spain, France and Mexico. He was also a member of the scientific board of the IMDEA Energy Institute. He was also an elected foreign member of National Academy of Engineering for discoveries using asymptotic analyses in combustion and for contributions to advance engineering science. In 2007, he received the "Miguel Catalán" Research Award from the Community of Madrid and was awarded in 1993 the Prince of Asturias Award for Scientific and Technical Research. A workshop in honor of Liñán's work was conducted in 2004 and the workshop papers are published in a book titled Simplicity, rigor and relevance in fluid mechanics : a volume in honor of Amable Liñán, CIMNE, (2004).

Liñán's biography in Spanish titled Amable Liñán: en busca del fulgor del fuego was published by Luis Urtilla Navarro in 2014.

== See also ==
- Norbert Peters
- Forman A. Williams
- Moshe Matalon
- John D. Buckmaster
- John Frederick Clarke
- Paul Clavin
