= Premixed flame =

Flame where the fuel and oxidizer are mixed before combustion

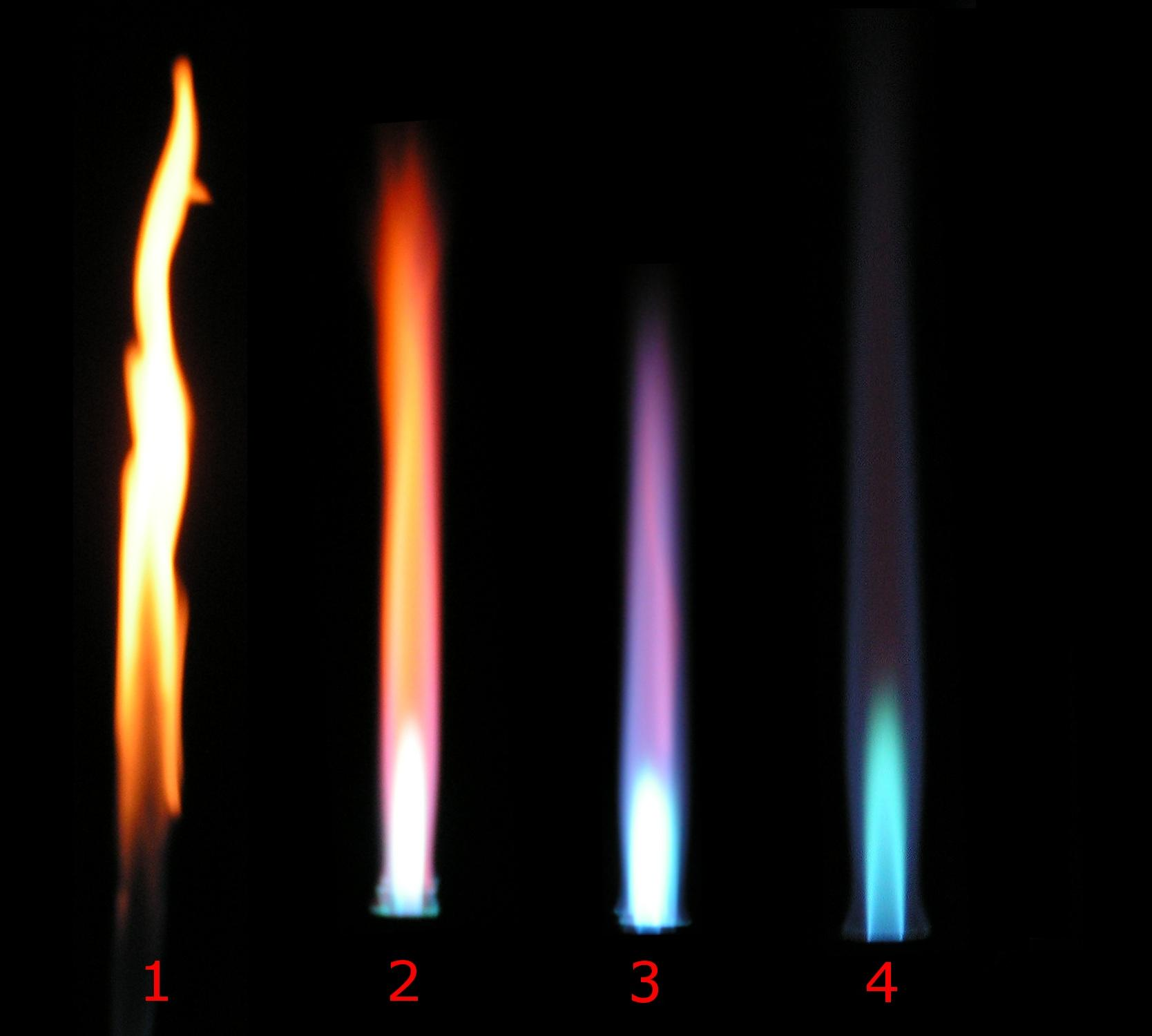
Different flame types of a Bunsen burner depend on oxygen supply. On the left a rich fuel mixture with no premixed oxygen produces a yellow sooty diffusion flame, and on the right a lean fully oxygen premixed flame produces no soot and the flame color is produced by molecular radical band emission.

A premixed flame is a flame formed under certain conditions during the combustion of a premixed charge (also called pre-mixture) of fuel and oxidiser. Since the fuel and oxidiser—the key chemical reactants of combustion—are available throughout a homogeneous stoichiometric premixed charge, the combustion process once initiated sustains itself by way of its own heat release. The majority of the chemical transformation in such a combustion process occurs primarily in a thin interfacial region which separates the unburned and the burned gases. The premixed flame interface propagates through the mixture until the entire charge is depleted. The propagation speed of a premixed flame is known as the flame speed (or burning velocity) which depends on the convection-diffusion-reaction balance within the flame, i.e. on its inner chemical structure. The premixed flame is characterised as laminar or turbulent depending on the velocity distribution in the unburned pre-mixture (which provides the medium of propagation for the flame).

== Premixed flame propagation ==
=== Laminar ===
Under controlled conditions (typically in a laboratory) a laminar flame may be formed in one of several possible flame configurations. The inner structure of a laminar premixed flame is composed of layers over which the decomposition, reaction and complete oxidation of fuel occurs. These chemical processes are much faster than the physical processes such as vortex motion in the flow and, hence, the inner structure of a laminar flame remains intact in most circumstances. The constitutive layers of the inner structure correspond to specified intervals over which the temperature increases from the specified unburned mixture up to as high as the adiabatic flame temperature (AFT). In the presence of volumetric heat transfer and/or aerodynamic stretch, or under the development intrinsic flame instabilities, the extent of reaction and, hence, the temperature attained across the flame may be different from the AFT.

==== Laminar burning velocity ====
For a one-step irreversible chemistry, i.e., $\nu_F \rm{F} + \nu_O \rm{O}_2 \rightarrow \rm{Products}$, the planar, adiabatic flame has explicit expression for the burning velocity derived from activation energy asymptotics when the Zel'dovich number $\beta\gg 1.$ The reaction rate $\omega$ (number of moles of fuel consumed per unit volume per unit time) is taken to be Arrhenius form,

$$\omega = B \left(\frac{\rho Y_F}{W_{F}}\right)^m \left(\frac{\rho Y_{O_2}}{W_{O_2}}\right)^n e^{-E_a/RT},$$

where $B$ is the pre-exponential factor, $\rho$ is the density, $Y_F$ is the fuel mass fraction, $Y_{O_2}$ is the oxidizer mass fraction, $E_a$ is the activation energy, $R$ is the universal gas constant, $T$ is the temperature, $W_F\ \& \ W_{O_2}$ are the molecular weights of fuel and oxidizer, respectively and $m\ \& \ n$ are the reaction orders. Let the unburnt conditions far ahead of the flame be denoted with subscript $u$ and similarly, the burnt gas conditions by $b$, then we can define an equivalence ratio $\phi$ for the unburnt mixture as

$$\phi = \frac{\nu_{O_2} W_{O_2}}{\nu_F W_F}\frac{Y_{F,u}}{Y_{O_2,u}}$$.

Then the planar laminar burning velocity for fuel-rich mixture ($\phi>1$) is given by

$$S_L=\left\{\frac{2 B\lambda_b \rho_b^{m+n} \nu_F^m Y_{O_2,u}^{m+n-1} G(n,m,a)}{ c_{p,b} \rho_u^2 \nu_{O_2} W_{O_2}^{m+n-1} \beta^{m+n+1} \mathrm{Le}_{O_2}^{-n} \mathrm{Le}_F^{-m}}\right\}^{1/2} e^{-E_a/2RT_b} + O(\beta^{-1}),$$

where

$$G(n,m,a) = \int_0^\infty y^n (y+a)^m\ dy$$

and $a=\beta(\phi-1)/\mathrm{Le}_F$. Here $\lambda$ is the thermal conductivity, $c_p$ is the specific heat at constant pressure and $\mathrm{Le}$ is the Lewis number. Similarly one can write the formula for lean $\phi<1$ mixtures. This result is first obtained by T. Mitani in 1980. Second order correction to this formula with more complicated transport properties were derived by Forman A. Williams and co-workers in the 80s.

Variations in local propagation speed of a laminar flame arise due to what is called flame stretch. Flame stretch can happen due to the straining by outer flow velocity field or the curvature of flame; the difference in the propagation speed from the corresponding laminar speed is a function of these effects and may be written as:

$$S_T=S_L + \mathcal{M}_c \delta_L (S_L-\mathbf{v}\cdot\mathbf{n}) \nabla \cdot \mathbf{n} - \mathcal{M}_t \delta_L  \nabla_t\cdot \mathbf{v}_t$$

where $\mathbf{n}$ is the unit normal to the flame surface (pointing towards the burnt gas side), $\mathbf{v}$ is the flow velocity field evaluated at the flame surface and $\nabla_t\cdot \mathbf{v}_t$ is the surface divergence of the tangential velocity $\mathbf{v}_t=(\mathbf{I}-\mathbf{n}\otimes\mathbf{n})\mathbf{v}$; with flow being incompressible outside the flame, $\nabla_t\cdot \mathbf{v}_t=-\mathbf{n}\otimes\mathbf{n}:\nabla\mathbf{v}-(\mathbf{v}\cdot\mathbf{n})\nabla\cdot\mathbf{n}$. Moreover, $\mathcal{M}_c$ and $\mathcal{M}_t$ are the two Markstein numbers, associated with the curvature and tangential straining.

=== Turbulent ===
In practical scenarios, turbulence is inevitable and, under moderate conditions, turbulence aids the premixed burning process as it enhances the mixing process of fuel and oxidiser. If the premixed charge of gases is not homogeneously mixed, the variations on equivalence ratio may affect the propagation speed of the flame. In some cases, this is desirable as in stratified combustion of blended fuels.

A turbulent premixed flame can be assumed to propagate as a surface composed of an ensemble of laminar flames so long as the processes that determine the inner structure of the flame are not affected. Under such conditions, the flame surface is wrinkled by virtue of turbulent motion in the premixed gases increasing the surface area of the flame. The wrinkling process increases the burning velocity of the turbulent premixed flame in comparison to its laminar counterpart.

The propagation of such a premixed flame may be analysed using the field equation called as G equation for a scalar $G$ as:

$$\frac{\partial G}{\partial t} + \mathbf{v} \cdot \nabla G = S_T |\nabla G|$$,

which is defined such that the level-sets of G represent the various interfaces within the premixed flame propagating with a local velocity $S_T$. This, however, is typically not the case as the propagation speed of the interface (with resect to unburned mixture) varies from point to point due to the aerodynamic stretch induced due to gradients in the velocity field.

Under contrasting conditions, however, the inner structure of the premixed flame may be entirely disrupted causing the flame to extinguish either locally (known as local extinction) or globally (known as global extinction or blow-off). Such opposing cases govern the operation of practical combustion devices such as spark-ignition engines as well as aero-engine afterburners. The prediction of the extent to which the inner structure of flame is affected in turbulent flow is a topic of extensive research.

== Premixed flame configuration ==
The flow configuration of premixed gases affects the stabilization and burning characteristics of the:

=== Bunsen flame ===
In a Bunsen flame, a steady flow rate is provided which matches the flame speed so as to stabilize the flame. If the flow rate is below the flame speed, the flame will move upstream until the fuel is consumed or until it encounters a flame holder. If the flow rate is equal to the flame speed, we would expect a stationary flat flame front normal to the flow direction. If the flow rate is above the flame speed, the flame front will become conical such that the component of the velocity vector normal to the flame front is equal to the flame speed.

=== Stagnation flame ===
Here, the pre-mixed gases flow in such a way so as to form a region of stagnation (zero velocity) where the flame may be stabilized.

=== Spherical flame ===
In this configuration, the flame is typically initiated by way of a spark within a homogeneous pre-mixture. The subsequent propagation of the developed premixed flame occurs as a spherical front until the mixture is transformed entirely or the walls of the combustion vessel are reached.

== Applications ==
Since the equivalence ratio of the premixed gases may be controlled, premixed combustion offers a means to attain low temperatures and, thereby, reduce NO_{x} emissions. Due to improved mixing in comparison with diffusion flames, soot formation is mitigated as well. Premixed combustion has therefore gained significance in recent times. The uses involve lean-premixed-prevaporized (LPP) gas turbines and spark-ignition engines.

== See also ==
- Flamelet generated manifold
- Luminous flame
- Oxy–fuel
