= Shvab–Zeldovich formulation =

Mathematical method in fluid dynamics

The Shvab–Zeldovich formulation is an approach to remove the chemical-source terms from the conservation equations for energy and chemical species by linear combinations of independent variables, when the conservation equations are expressed in a common form. Expressing conservation equations in common form often limits the range of applicability of the formulation. The method was first introduced by V. A. Shvab in 1948 and by Yakov Zeldovich in 1949.

== Method ==
For simplicity, assume combustion takes place in a single global irreversible reaction

$\sum_{i=1}^N \nu_i' \real_i \rightarrow \sum_{i=1}^N \nu_i'' \real_i$

where $\real_i$ is the ith chemical species of the total $N$ species and $\nu_i'$ and $\nu_i''$ are the stoichiometric coefficients of the reactants and products, respectively. Then, it can be shown from the law of mass action that the rate of moles produced per unit volume of any species $\omega$ is constant and given by

$\omega = \frac{w_i}{W_i(\nu_i''-\nu_i')}$

where $w_i$ is the mass of species i produced or consumed per unit volume and $W_i$ is the molecular weight of species i.

The main approximation involved in Shvab–Zeldovich formulation is that all binary diffusion coefficients $D$ of all pairs of species are the same and equal to the thermal diffusivity. In other words, Lewis number of all species are constant and equal to one. This puts a limitation on the range of applicability of the formulation since in reality, except for methane, ethylene, oxygen and some other reactants, Lewis numbers vary significantly from unity. The steady, low Mach number conservation equations for the species and energy in terms of the rescaled independent variables

$\alpha_i=Y_i/[W_i(\nu_i''-\nu_i')] \quad \text{and} \quad \alpha_T = \frac{\int_{T_{ref}}^T c_p\, \mathrm{d}T}{\sum_{i=1}^Nh_i^0 W_i(\nu_i'-\nu_i'')}$

where $Y_i$ is the mass fraction of species i, $c_p = \sum_{i=1}^N Y_i c_{p,i}$ is the specific heat at constant pressure of the mixture, $T$ is the temperature and $h_i^0$ is the formation enthalpy of species i, reduce to

$$\begin{align}
\nabla\cdot[\rho\boldsymbol{v} \alpha_i - \rho D\nabla \alpha_i] = \omega,\\
\nabla\cdot[\rho\boldsymbol{v} \alpha_T - \rho D\nabla \alpha_T] = \omega
\end{align}$$

where $\rho$ is the gas density and $\boldsymbol{v}$ is the flow velocity. The above set of $N+1$ nonlinear equations, expressed in a common form, can be replaced with $N$ linear equations and one nonlinear equation. Suppose the nonlinear equation corresponds to $\alpha_1$ so that

$\nabla\cdot[\rho\boldsymbol{v} \alpha_1 - \rho D\nabla \alpha_1] = \omega$

then by defining the linear combinations $\beta_T=\alpha_T-\alpha_1$ and $\beta_i=\alpha_i-\alpha_1$ with $i\neq 1$, the remaining $N$ governing equations required become

$$\begin{align}
\nabla\cdot[\rho\boldsymbol{v} \beta_i - \rho D\nabla \beta_i] = 0,\\
\nabla\cdot[\rho\boldsymbol{v} \beta_T - \rho D\nabla \beta_T] = 0.
\end{align}$$

The linear combinations automatically removes the nonlinear reaction term in the above $N$ equations.

== Shvab–Zeldovich–Liñán formulation ==
Shvab–Zeldovich–Liñán formulation was introduced by Amable Liñán in 1991 for diffusion-flame problems where the chemical time scale is infinitely small (Burke–Schumann limit) so that the flame appears as a thin reaction sheet. The reactants can have Lewis number that is not necessarily equal to one.

Suppose the non-dimensional scalar equations for fuel mass fraction $Y_F$ (defined such that it takes a unit value in the fuel stream), oxidizer mass fraction $Y_O$ (defined such that it takes a unit value in the oxidizer stream) and non-dimensional temperature $T$ (measured in units of oxidizer-stream temperature) are given by

$$\begin{align}
\rho \frac{\partial Y_F}{\partial t} + \rho \mathbf{v}\cdot\nabla Y_F &= \frac{1}{Le_F}\nabla\cdot(\rho D_T \nabla Y_F) - \omega,\\
\rho \frac{\partial Y_O}{\partial t} + \rho \mathbf{v}\cdot\nabla Y_O &= \frac{1}{Le_O}\nabla\cdot(\rho D_T \nabla Y_O) - S\omega,\\
\rho \frac{\partial T}{\partial t} + \rho \mathbf{v}\cdot\nabla T &= \nabla\cdot(\rho D_T \nabla T) + q\omega
\end{align}$$

where $\omega=Da\,Y_FY_O e^{-E/RT}$ is the reaction rate, $Da$ is the appropriate Damköhler number, $S$ is the mass of oxidizer stream required to burn unit mass of fuel stream, $q$ is the non-dimensional amount of heat released per unit mass of fuel stream burnt and $e^{-E/RT}$ is the Arrhenius exponent. Here, $Le_F$ and $Le_O$ are the Lewis number of the fuel and oxygen, respectively and $D_T$ is the thermal diffusivity. In the Burke–Schumann limit, $Da\rightarrow \infty$ leading to the equilibrium condition

$$Y_FY_O = 0$$.

In this case, the reaction terms on the right-hand side become Dirac delta functions. To solve this problem, Liñán introduced the following functions

$$\begin{align}
Z = \frac{SY_F-Y_O+1}{S+1}, &\qquad \tilde Z = \frac{\tilde SY_F-Y_O+1}{\tilde S+1},\\
H = \frac{T-T_0}{T_s-T_0} + Y_F + Y_O -1 , &\qquad \tilde H = \frac{T-T_0}{T_s-T_0} + \frac{Y_O}{Le_O} + \frac{Y_F-1}{Le_F}
\end{align}$$

where $\tilde S = SLe_O/Le_F$, $T_0$ is the fuel-stream temperature and $T_s$ is the adiabatic flame temperature, both measured in units of oxidizer-stream temperature. Introducing these functions reduces the governing equations to

$$\begin{align}
\rho \frac{\partial Z}{\partial t} + \rho \mathbf{v}\cdot\nabla Z &= \frac{1}{Le_m}\nabla\cdot(\rho D_T \nabla \tilde Z),\\
\rho \frac{\partial H}{\partial t} + \rho \mathbf{v}\cdot\nabla H &= \nabla\cdot(\rho D_T \nabla \tilde H),
\end{align}$$

where $Le_m=Le_O (S+1)/(\tilde S+1)$ is the mean (or, effective) Lewis number. The relationship between $Z$ and $\tilde Z$ and between $H$ and $\tilde H$ can be derived from the equilibrium condition.

At the stoichiometric surface (the flame surface), both $Y_F$ and $Y_O$ are equal to zero, leading to $Z=Z_s=1/(S+1)$, $\tilde Z=\tilde Z_s=1/(\tilde S+1)$, $H=H_s =(T_f-T_0)/(T_s-T_0)-1$ and $\tilde H=\tilde H_s = (T_f-T_0)/(T_s-T_0)-1/Le_F$, where $T_f$ is the flame temperature (measured in units of oxidizer-stream temperature) that is, in general, not equal to $T_s$ unless $Le_F=Le_O=1$. On the fuel stream, since $Y_F-1=Y_O=T-T_0=0$, we have $Z-1=\tilde Z-1=H=\tilde H=0$. Similarly, on the oxidizer stream, since $Y_F=Y_O-1=T-1=0$, we have $Z=\tilde Z=H-(1-T_0)/(T_s-T_0)=\tilde H-(1-T_0)/(T_s-T_0)-1/Le_O+1/Le_F=0$.

The equilibrium condition defines

$$\begin{align}
\tilde Z<\tilde Z_s: &\qquad  Y_F = 0,\,\,\, Y_O = 1-\frac{\tilde Z}{\tilde Z_s}=1-\frac{Z}{Z_s},\\
\tilde Z>\tilde Z_s: &\qquad  Y_O = 0,\,\,\, Y_F = \frac{\tilde Z-\tilde Z_s}{1-\tilde Z_s}=\frac{Z-Z_s}{1-Z_s}.
\end{align}$$

The above relations define the piecewise function $Z(\tilde Z)$

$$Z=\begin{cases}
\tilde Z/Le_m,\quad \text{if}\,\,\tilde Z<\tilde Z_s\\
Z_s + Le(\tilde Z-\tilde Z_s)/Le_m ,\quad \text{if}\,\,\tilde Z>\tilde Z_s
\end{cases}$$

where $Le_m=\tilde Z_s/Z_s=(S+1)/(S/Le_F+1)$ is a mean Lewis number. This leads to a nonlinear equation for $\tilde Z$. Since $H-\tilde H$ is only a function of $Y_F$ and $Y_O$, the above expressions can be used to define the function $H(\tilde Z,\tilde H)$

$$H=\tilde H + \begin{cases}
(1/Le_F-1) -(1/Le_O-1)(1-\tilde Z/\tilde Z_s),\quad \text{if}\,\,\tilde Z<\tilde Z_s\\
(1/Le_F-1)(1-\tilde Z)/(1-\tilde Z_s) ,\quad \text{if}\,\,\tilde Z>\tilde Z_s
\end{cases}$$

With appropriate boundary conditions for $\tilde H$, the problem can be solved.

It can be shown that $\tilde Z$ and $\tilde H$ are conserved scalars, that is, their derivatives are continuous when crossing the reaction sheet, whereas $Z$ and $H$ have gradient jumps across the flame sheet.
