= Liñán's diffusion flame theory =

Liñán diffusion flame theory is a theory developed by Amable Liñán in 1974 to explain the diffusion flame structure using activation energy asymptotics and Damköhler number asymptotics. Liñán used counterflowing jets of fuel and oxidizer to study the diffusion flame structure, analyzing for the entire range of Damköhler number. His theory predicted four different types of flame structure as follows,

- Nearly-frozen ignition regime, where deviations from the frozen flow conditions are small (no reaction sheet exist in this regime),
- Partial burning regime, where both fuel and oxidizer cross the reaction zone and enter into the frozen flow on other side,
- Premixed flame regime, where only one of the reactants cross the reaction zone, in which case, reaction zone separates a frozen flow region from a near-equilibrium region,
- Near-equilibrium diffusion-controlled regime, is a thin reaction zone, separating two near-equilibrium region.

== Mathematical description ==
The theory is well explained in the simplest possible model. Thus, assuming a one-step irreversible Arrhenius law for the combustion chemistry with constant density and transport properties and with unity Lewis number reactants, the governing equation for the non-dimensional temperature field $T(y)$ in the stagnation point flow reduces to

$$\frac{d^2 T}{dy^2} + y\frac{dT}{dy} = -\mathrm{Da}\ y_F y_O e^{-T_a/T}, \quad Z= \frac{1}{2}\mathrm{erfc}\left(\frac{y}{\sqrt 2}\right)$$

where $Z$ is the mixture fraction, $\mathrm{Da}$ is the Damköhler number, $T_a = E/R$ is the activation temperature and the fuel mass fraction and oxidizer mass fraction are scaled with their respective feed stream values, given by

$$\begin{align}
y_F &= Z + T_o - T \\
y_O &= (1-Z)/S + T_o - T
\end{align}$$

with boundary conditions $T(-\infty)=T(\infty)=T_o$. Here, $T_o$ is the unburnt temperature profile (frozen solution) and $S$ is the stoichiometric parameter (mass of oxidizer stream required to burn unit mass of fuel stream). The four regime are analyzed by trying to solve above equations using activation energy asymptotics and Damköhler number asymptotics. The solution to above problem is multi-valued. Treating mixture fraction $Z$ as independent variable reduces the equation to

$$\frac{d^2 T}{dZ^2} = - 2\pi e^{y^2} \mathrm{Da}\ y_F y_O e^{-T_a/T}$$

with boundary conditions $T(0)=T(1)=T_o$ and $y = \sqrt{2} \mathrm{erfc}^{-1}(2Z)$.

== Extinction Damköhler number ==
The reduced Damköhler number is defined as follows

$$\delta = 8\pi Z_s^2 e^{y_s^2} \left(\frac{T_s^2}{T_a}\right)^3 \mathrm{Da}\ e^{-T_a/T}$$

where $y_s =\sqrt{2} \mathrm{erfc}^{-1}(2Z_s),\ Z_s = 1/(S+1)$ and $T_s = T_o + Z_s$. The theory predicted an expression for the reduced Damköhler number at which the flame will extinguish, given by

$$\delta_E = e\left[(1-\gamma)-(1-\gamma)^2+0.26(1-\gamma)^3 +0.055(1-\gamma)^4\right]$$

where $\gamma=1-2(1-\alpha)(1-Z_s)$.

== See also ==
- Liñán's equation
- Emmons problem
- Clarke–Riley diffusion flame
- Burke–Schumann flame
