= Droplet vaporization =

Phenomenon in fluid dynamics

The vaporizing droplet (droplet vaporization) problem is a challenging issue in fluid dynamics. It is part of many engineering situations involving the transport and computation of sprays: fuel injection, spray painting, aerosol spray, flashing releases… In most of these engineering situations there is a relative motion between the droplet and the surrounding gas. The gas flow over the droplet has many features of the gas flow over a rigid sphere: pressure gradient, viscous boundary layer, wake. In addition to these common flow features one can also mention the internal liquid circulation phenomenon driven by surface-shear forces and the boundary layer blowing effect.

One of the key parameter which characterizes the gas flow over the droplet is the droplet Reynolds number based on the relative velocity, droplet diameter and gas phase properties. The features of the gas flow have a critical impact on the exchanges of mass, momentum and energy between the gas and the liquid phases and thus, they have to be properly accounted for in any vaporizing droplet model.

As a first step it is worth investigating the simple case where there is no relative motion between the droplet and the surrounding gas. It will provide some useful insights on the physics involved in the vaporizing droplet problem. In a second step models used in engineering situations where a relative motion between the droplet and the surrounding exists are presented.

== Single spherically symmetric droplet ==
In this section we assume that there is no relative motion between the droplet and the gas, $Re_d=0$, and that the temperature inside the droplet is uniform (models that account for the non-uniformity of the droplet temperature are presented in the next section). The time evolution of the droplet radius, $r_d$, and droplet temperature, $T_d$, can be computed by solving the following set of ordinary differential equations:

$$4 \pi r^{2}_d \rho_L \frac{\mathrm{d} r_d}{\mathrm{d} t}= - \dot{m}_F.$$
$$\frac{4}{3} \pi r^{3}_d \rho_L C_{pL} \frac{\mathrm{d} T_d}{\mathrm{d} t}= Q_L.$$

where:

- $\rho_L$ is the liquid density (kg.m^{−3})
- $\dot{m}_F$ is the vaporization rate of the droplet (kg.s^{−1})
- $C_{pL}$ is the liquid specific heat at constant pressure (J.kg^{−1}.K^{−1})
- $Q_L$ is the heat flux entering the droplet (J.s^{−1})

The heat flux entering the droplet can be expressed as:

$$Q_L = Q_g - \dot{m}_F L_{vap}$$

where:

- $Q_g$ is the heat flux from the gas to the droplet surface (J.s^{−1})
- $L_{vap}$ is the latent heat of evaporation of the species considered (J.kg^{−1})

Analytical expressions for the droplet vaporization rate, $\dot{m}_F$, and for the heat flux $Q_g$ are now derived. A single, pure, component droplet is considered and the gas phase is assumed to behave as an ideal gas. A spherically symmetric field exists for the gas field surrounding the droplet. Analytical expressions for $\dot{m}_F$ and $Q_g$ are found by considering heat and mass transfer processes in the gas film surrounding the droplet. The droplet vaporizes and creates a radial flow field in the gas film. The vapor from the droplet convects and diffuses away from the droplet surface. Heat conducts radially against the convection toward the droplet interface. This process is called Stefan convection or Stefan flow.

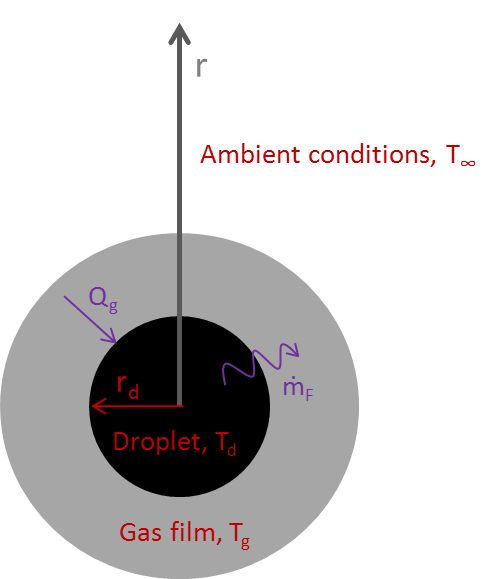
Sketch of a vaporizing droplet

The gas phase conservation equations for mass, fuel-vapor mass fraction and energy are written in a spherical coordinate system:

$$\frac{\partial}{\partial{r}} \left(\rho_g r^2 u\right) = 0$$
$$\frac{\partial}{\partial{r}} \left(\rho_g r^2 u Y_F\right) - \frac{\partial}{\partial{r}} \left(\rho_g \mathcal{D} r^2 \frac{\partial{Y_F}}{\partial{r}}\right) = 0$$
$$\frac{\partial}{\partial{r}} \left(\rho_g r^2 u h_g\right) - \frac{\partial}{\partial{r}} \left(\lambda_g r^2 \frac{\partial{T_g}}{\partial{r}}\right) - \frac{\partial}{\partial{r}} \left(\sum_{i=1}^{N} \rho_g \mathcal{D} h_i r^2  \frac{\partial{Y_i}}{\partial{r}} \right) = 0$$

where:

- $\rho_g$ density of the gas phase (kg.m^{−3})
- $r$ radial position (m)
- $u$ Stefan velocity (m.s^{−1})
- $Y_F$ Fuel mass fraction in the gas film (-)
- $\mathcal{D}$ Mass diffusivity (m^{2}.s^{−1})
- $h_g$ Enthalpy of the gas (J.kg^{−1})
- $T_g$ Gas film temperature (K)
- $\lambda_g$ Thermal conductivity of the gas (W.m^{−1}.K^{−1})
- $N$ Number of species inside the gas phase, i.e. air + fuel (-)

It is assumed that the gas phase heat and mass transfer processes are quasi-steady and that the thermo-physical properties might be considered as constant. The assumption of quasi-steadiness of the gas phase finds its limitation in situations in which the gas film surrounding the droplet is in a near-critical state or in a situation in which the gas field is submitted to an acoustic field. The assumption of constant thermo-physical properties is found to be satisfying provided that the properties are evaluated at some reference conditions

$$T_r = T_s + A_r \left( T_{\infty} - T_s \right)$$
$$Y_r = Y_{F,s} + A_r \left( Y_{F,\infty} - Y_{F,s} \right)$$

where:

- $T_r$ is the reference temperature (K)
- $T_s$ is the temperature at the droplet surface (K)
- $T_{\infty}$ is the temperature of the gas far away from the droplet surface (K)
- $Y_r$ is the reference fuel mass fraction (-)
- $Y_{F,s}$ is the fuel mass fraction at the droplet surface (-)
- $Y_{F,\infty}$ is the fuel mass fraction far away from the droplet surface (-)

The 1/3 averaging rule, $A_r=\frac{1}{3}$, is often recommended in the literature

The conservation equation of mass simplifies to:

$$\rho_g r^2 u = cte = \left( \rho_g r^2 u\right)_s = \frac{\dot{m}_F}{4\pi}$$

Combining the conservation equations for mass and fuel vapor mass fraction the following differential equation for the fuel vapor mass fraction $Y_F(r)$ is obtained:

$$4 \pi r^2 \rho_g \mathcal{D} \frac{\mathrm{d}Y_F(r)}{\mathrm{d}r} = \dot{m}_F  \left( Y_F(r)-1\right)$$

Integrating this equation between $r$ and the ambient gas phase region $r = \infty$ and applying the boundary condition at $r=r_d$ gives the expression for the droplet vaporization rate:

$$\dot{m}_F = 4 \pi \rho_g \mathcal{D} r_d \ln \left(1+ B_M \right)$$

and

$$B_M=\frac{Y_{F,\infty}-Y_{F,s}}{Y_{F,s}-1}$$

where:

- $B_M$ is the Spalding mass transfer number

Phase equilibrium is assumed at the droplet surface and the mole fraction of fuel vapor at the droplet surface is obtained via the use of the Clapeyron's equation.

An analytical expression for the heat flux $Q_g$ is now derived. After some manipulations the conservation equation of energy writes:

$$\frac{\partial}{\partial{r}} \left( \dot{m}_F h_F - \lambda_g r^2 \frac{\partial{T_g}}{\partial{r}} \right) = 0$$

where:

- $h_F$ is the enthalpy of the fuel vapor (J.kg^{−1})

Applying the boundary condition at the droplet surface and using the relation $h=C_p \mathrm{d}T$ we have:

$$4 \pi \lambda_g r^2 \frac{\mathrm{d}T_g}{\mathrm{d}r} = \dot{m}_F C_{p,F} \left( T_g - T_d + \frac{Q_g}{\dot{m}_F C_{p,F}}\right)$$

where:

- $C_{p,F}$ is the specific heat at constant pressure of the fuel vapor (J.Kg^{−1}.K^{−1})

Integrating this equation from $r$ to the ambient gas phase conditions ($\infty$) gives the variation of the gas film temperature ($T_g$) as a function of the radial distance:

$$\ln \left( \frac{T_{\infty}-T_d + \frac{Q_g}{\dot{m}_F C_{p,F}}}{T_g-T_d+\frac{Q_g}{\dot{m}_F C_{p,F}}}\right) = \frac{1}{r}\frac{\dot{m}_F C_{p,F}}{4 \pi \lambda_g}$$

The above equation provides a second expression for the droplet vaporization rate:

$$\dot{m}_F=4 \pi r_d \frac{\lambda_g}{C_{p,F}} \ln \left( 1 + B_T\right)$$

and

$$B_T=\frac{\dot{m}_F C_{p,F}}{Q_g} \left( T_{\infty} - T_d\right)$$

where:

- $B_T$ is the Spalding heat transfer number

Finally combining the new expression for the droplet vaporization rate and the expression for the variation of the gas film temperature the following equation is obtained for $Q_g$:

$$Q_g = 4 \pi r_d \lambda_g \frac{\ln \left( 1 + B_T\right)}{B_T} \left( T_{\infty} - T_d\right)$$

Two different expressions for the droplet vaporization rate $\dot{m}_F$ have been derived. Hence, a relation exists between the Spalding mass transfer number and the Spalding heat transfer number and writes:

$$B_T=\left( 1+B_M\right)^{\frac{1}{Le}\frac{C_{p,F}}{C_{p,g}}}-1$$

where:

- $Le$ is the gas film Lewis number (-)
- $C_{p,g}$ is the gas film specific heat at constant pressure (J.Kg^{−1}.K^{−1})

The droplet vaporization rate can be expressed as a function of the Sherwood number. The Sherwood number describes the non-dimensional mass transfer rate to the droplet and is defined as:

$$Sh = \frac{-2 r_d}{Y_s-Y_{\infty}} \left(\frac{\partial{Y_F}}{\partial{r}}\right)_s = 2 \frac{\ln \left( 1+B_M\right)}{B_M}$$

Thus, the expression for the droplet vaporization rate can be re-written as:

$$\dot{m}_F=2 \pi r_d \mathcal{D} \rho_g B_M Sh$$

Similarly, the conductive heat transfer from the gas to the droplet can be expressed as a function of the Nusselt number. The Nusselt number describes a non-dimensional heat transfer rate to the droplet and is defined as:

$$Nu=\frac{2 r_d}{T_{\infty}-T_d}\left(\frac{\partial{T_g}}{\partial{r}}\right)_s = 2 \frac{\ln \left( 1+B_T\right)}{B_T}$$

and then:

$$Q_g=2 \pi r_d \lambda_g Nu \left(T_{\infty}-T_d\right)$$

In the limit where $B_T \to 0$ we have $Nu \to 2$ which corresponds to the classical heated sphere result.

== Single convective droplet ==
The relative motion between a droplet and the gas results in an increase of the heat and mass transfer rates in the gas film surrounding the droplet. A convective boundary layer and a wake can surround the droplet. Furthermore, the shear force on the liquid surface causes an internal circulation that enhances the heating of the liquid. As a consequence, the vaporization rate increases with the droplet Reynolds number. Many different models exist for the single convective droplet vaporization case. Vaporizing droplet models can be seen to belong to six different classes:

1. Constant droplet temperature model (d^{2}-law)
2. Infinite liquid conductivity model
3. Spherically symmetric transient droplet heating model
4. Effective conductivity model
5. Vortex model of droplet heating
6. Navier-Stokes solution

The main difference between all these models is the treatment of the heating of the liquid phase which is usually the rate controlling phenomenon in droplet vaporization. The first three models do not consider internal liquid circulation. The effective conductivity model (4) and the vortex model of droplet heating (5) account for internal circulation and internal convective heating. The direct resolution of the Navier-Stokes equations provide, in principle, exact solutions both for the gas phase and the liquid phase.

Model (1) is a simplification of model (2) which is in turn a simplification of model (3). The spherically symmetric transient droplet heating model (3) solves the equation for heat diffusion through the liquid phase. A droplet heating time τ_{h} can be defined as the time required for a thermal diffusion wave to penetrate from the droplet surface to its center. The droplet heating time is compared to the droplet lifetime, τ_{l}. If the droplet heating time is short compared to the droplet lifetime we can assume that the temperature field inside the droplet is uniform and model (2) is obtained. In the infinite liquid conductivity model (2) the temperature of the droplet is uniform but varies with time. It is possible to go one step further and find the conditions for which we can neglect the temporal variation of the droplet temperature. The liquid temperature varies in time until the wet-bulb temperature is reached. If the wet-bulb temperature is reached in a time of the same order of magnitude as the droplet heating time, then the liquid temperature can be considered to be constant with regard to time; model (1), the d^{2}-law, is obtained.

The infinite liquid conductivity model is widely used in industrial spray calculations: for its balance between computational costs and accuracy. To account for the convective effects which enhanced the heat and mass transfer rates around the droplet, a correction is applied to the spherically symmetric expressions of the Sherwood and Nusselt numbers

$$\dot{m}_F = 2 \pi \rho_g \mathcal{D} r_d Sh^* \ln \left(1+ B_M \right)$$
$$Q_g = 2 \pi r_d \lambda_g Nu^* \frac{\ln \left( 1 + B_T\right)}{B_T} \left( T_{\infty} - T_d\right)$$

Abramzon and Sirignano suggest the following formulation for the modified Sherwood and Nusselt numbers:

$$Sh^*=2+ \frac{\left(Sh_0-2\right)}{F_M}$$
$$Nu^*=2+ \frac{\left(Nu_0-2\right)}{F_T}$$

where $F_M$ and $F_T$ account for surface blowing which results in a thickening of the boundary layer surrounding the droplet.

$Nu_0$ and $Sh_0$ can be found from the well-known Frössling, or Ranz-Marshall, correlation:

$$Sh_0=2 + 0.552 Re^{\frac{1}{2}} Sc^{\frac{1}{3}}$$
$$Nu_0=2 + 0.552 Re^{\frac{1}{2}} Pr^{\frac{1}{3}}$$

where

- $Sc$ is the Schmidt number,
- $Pr$ is the Prandtl number,
- $Re$ is the Reynolds number.

The expressions above show that the heat and mass transfer rates increase with increasing Reynolds number.
