= Millan =

Millan or Millán is both a surname and a given name. Notable people with the name include:

Surname:

- Agustín Millán (born 1958), Spanish handball player
- Alejandro Millán (born 1980), Mexican musician
- Amy Millan, Canadian singer and musician
- Ana Millán Gasca (born 1964), Spanish historian of science and scholar of mathematics education
- Bruce Millan (1927–2013), Scottish politician
- Cesar Millan (born 1969), Mexican dog trainer
- Donald Millan (born 1986), Colombian footballer
- Félix Millán (born 1943), Puerto Rican baseball player
- Gonzalo Millán (1947–2006), Chilean writer and poet
- Gregorio Millán (1919–2004), Spanish aeronautical engineer and professor
- Juan Millán (born 1994), Spanish footballer
- Julio Millán (born 1977), Spanish politician
- Kieran Millan (born 1989), Canadian ice hockey player
- Laura Huertas Millán (born 1983), Colombian-French artist and film-maker
- Millán Millán, environmental scientist
- Natalia Millan (born 1969), Spanish actress
- Nicolás Millán (born 1991), Chilean footballer
- Scott Millan (born 1954), American audio engineer
- Victor Millan (1920–2009), American actor and academic

Given name:

- Millan Baçi (born 1955), Albanian footballer
- Millán Millán
