= Liñán's equation =

Type of ordinary differential equation

In the study of diffusion flame, Liñán's equation is a second-order nonlinear ordinary differential equation which describes the inner structure of the diffusion flame, first derived by Amable Liñán in 1974. The equation reads as

$$\frac{d^2y}{d\zeta^2} =(y^2-\zeta^2)e^{-\delta^{-1/3}(y+\gamma \zeta)}$$

subjected to the boundary conditions

$$\begin{align}
\zeta\rightarrow -\infty : &\quad \frac{dy}{d\zeta}=-1,\\
\zeta\rightarrow +\infty : &\quad \frac{dy}{d\zeta}=+1
\end{align}$$

where $\delta$ is the reduced or rescaled Damköhler number and $\gamma$ is the ratio of excess heat conducted to one side of the reaction sheet to the total heat generated in the reaction zone. If $\gamma>0$, more heat is transported to the oxidizer side, thereby reducing the reaction rate on the oxidizer side (since reaction rate depends on the temperature) and consequently greater amount of fuel will be leaked into the oxidizer side. Whereas, if $\gamma<0$, more heat is transported to the fuel side of the diffusion flame, thereby reducing the reaction rate on the fuel side of the flame and increasing the oxidizer leakage into the fuel side. When $\gamma\rightarrow 1$ $(\gamma\rightarrow -1)$, all the heat is transported to the oxidizer (fuel) side and therefore the flame sustains extremely large amount of fuel (oxidizer) leakage.

The equation is, in some aspects, universal (also called the canonical equation of the diffusion flame) since although Liñán derived the equation for stagnation point flow, assuming unity Lewis numbers for the reactants, the same equation is found to represent the inner structure for general laminar flamelets, having arbitrary Lewis numbers.

An alterernate equation, known as Liñán's equation for the premixed-flame regime is given by

$$\frac{d^2f}{d\zeta^2} =\Lambda f e^{-(f+m\zeta)}$$

subjected to the boundary conditions

$$\begin{align}
\zeta\rightarrow -\infty : &\quad \frac{df}{d\zeta}=-1,\\
\zeta\rightarrow +\infty : &\quad \frac{df}{d\zeta}=0.
\end{align}$$

== Existence of solutions ==
Near the extinction of the diffusion flame, $\delta$ is order unity. The equation has no solution for $\delta<\delta_E$, where $\delta_E$ is the extinction Damköhler number. For $\delta>\delta_E$ with $|\gamma|<1$, the equation possess two solutions, of which one is an unstable solution. Unique solution exist if $|\gamma|>1$ and $\delta>\delta_E$. The solution is unique for $\delta>\delta_I$, where $\delta_I$ is the ignition Damköhler number.

Liñán also gave a correlation formula for the extinction Damköhler number, which is increasingly accurate for $1-\gamma \ll 1$,

$$\delta_E = e[(1-\gamma)-(1-\gamma)^2+0.26(1-\gamma)^3 + 0.055(1-\gamma)^4].$$

== Generalized Liñán's equation ==
The generalized Liñán's equation is given by

$$\frac{d^2y}{d\zeta^2} =(y-\zeta)^m (y+\zeta)^ne^{-\delta^{-1/3}(y+\gamma \zeta)}$$

where $m$ and $n$ are constant reaction orders of fuel and oxidizer, respectively.

== Large Damköhler number limit ==
In the Burke–Schumann limit, $\delta\rightarrow\infty$. Then the equation reduces to

$$\frac{d^2y}{d\zeta^2} = (y-\zeta)^m(y+\zeta)^n, \quad \zeta\rightarrow\pm\infty:\, \frac{dy}{d\zeta}=\pm 1.$$

An approximate solution to this equation was developed by Liñán himself using integral method in 1963 for his thesis,

$$y(\zeta)=y_m + (\zeta-\zeta_m)\operatorname{erf}[k (\zeta-\zeta_m)] - \frac{1}{\sqrt{\pi} k}\left[1-e^{-k^2 (\zeta-\zeta_m)^2}\right],$$

where $\mathrm{erf}$ is the error function and

$$\begin{align}
\zeta_m &= \frac{n-m}{n+m} y_m,\\
y_m &= \frac{m+n}{2}\left[\frac{2}{\pi m^2n^2}\left(\sqrt{1+\frac{\pi(m+n)}{2mn}}-1\right)\right]^{\frac{1}{m+n+1}},\\
k &= \frac{\sqrt{\pi}}{2} m^m n^n\left(\frac{2y_m}{m+n}\right)^{m+n}.
\end{align}$$

Here $\zeta=\zeta_m$ is the location where $y(\zeta)$ reaches its minimum value $y(\zeta_m)=y_m$. When $m=n=1$, $\zeta_m=0$, $y_m=0.8702$ and $k=0.6711$.

== See also ==
- Liñán's diffusion flame theory
