= FGM (disambiguation) =

FGM stands for female genital mutilation, the removal of some or all of the external female genitalia for non-medical reasons.

FGM may also refer to:

- Fisher's geometric model, an evolutionary model
- Flamelet generated manifold, a chemistry reduction technique
- Functionally graded material, in materials science
- Free Gaza Movement

== See also ==
- FGM-77, the development name for the M47 Dragon anti-tank missile
- FGM-148 Javelin, an anti-tank missile
- FGM-172 SRAW, a short-range assault weapon
