= Laminar flame speed =

Property of a combustible mixture

Laminar flame speed is an intrinsic characteristic of premixed combustible mixtures. It is the speed at which an un-stretched laminar flame will propagate through a quiescent mixture of unburned reactants. Laminar flame speed is given the symbol s_{L}. According to the thermal flame theory of Ernest-François Mallard and Le Chatelier, the un-stretched laminar flame speed is dependent on only three properties of a chemical mixture: the thermal diffusivity of the mixture, the reaction rate of the mixture and the temperature through the flame zone:

$s_\mathrm{L}^{\circ} = \sqrt{\alpha \dot{\omega} \left( \dfrac{T_\mathrm{b} - T_\mathrm{i}}{T_\mathrm{i} - T_\mathrm{u}} \right)}$

$\alpha$ is thermal diffusivity,

$\dot{\omega}$ is reaction rate,

and the temperature subscript u is for unburned, b is for burned and i is for ignition temperature.

Laminar flame speed is a property of the mixture (fuel structure, stoichiometry) and thermodynamic conditions upon mixture ignition (pressure, temperature). Turbulent flame speed is a function of the aforementioned parameters, but also heavily depends on the flow field. As flow velocity increases and turbulence is introduced, a flame will begin to wrinkle, then corrugate and eventually the flame front will be broken and transport properties will be enhanced by turbulent eddies in the flame zone. As a result, the flame front of a turbulent flame will propagate at a speed that is not only a function of the mixture's chemical and transport properties but also properties of the flow and turbulence.

== See also ==
- Flame speed
- Chemical kinetics
- Activation energy asymptotics
