= Simple chemical reacting system =

The simple chemical reacting system (SCRS) is one of the combustion models for computational fluid dynamics. This model helps us to determine the process of combustion which is a vital phenomenon used in many engineering applications like aircraft engines, internal combustion engines, rocket engines, industrial furnaces, and power station combustors. The simple chemical reacting system (SCRS) refers the global nature of the combustion process considering only the final species concentrations. The detailed kinetics of the process is generally neglected and it postulates that combustion does proceed via a global one-step without intermediates. Infinitely fast chemical reaction is assumed with oxidants reacting in stoichiometric proportions to form products. SCRS considers the reaction to be irreversible i.e. rate of reverse reaction is presumed to be very low.

1 kg of fuel + s kg of oxidant → (1 + s) kg of products

For the combustion of the methane gas the equation becomes

CH_{4} + 2O_{2} → CO_{2} + 2H_{2}O

1 mole of CH_{4} + 2 moles of O_{2} → 1 mole of CO_{2} + 2 moles of H_{2}O

The stoichiometric proportions of the above equation is given by

1 kg of CH_{4} + (64/16) kg of O_{2} → (1+ 64/16) kg of products

The transport equations for the fuel and oxygen mass fractions are

${d (\rho m_{fu} ) \over d t} + div(\rho m_{fu} u) = div(R_{fu} .grad m_{fu}) + S_{fu}$

${d (\rho m_{ox} ) \over d t} + div(\rho m_{ox} u) = div(R_{ox} .grad m_{ox}) + S_{ox}$

Now consider a variable ‘$\phi$’ defined by

$\phi = sm_{fu}-m_{ox}$

Also the mass transport coefficients, appearing in the transport equations are assumed to be a constant and are equal to ‘R_{Φ}’

Now the transport equations of fuel and oxygen can be written as

$${d (\rho  \phi ) \over d t} + div(\rho  \phi u) = div(R_\phi . grad \phi) + (s.S_{fu} - S_{ox})$$

Assuming the reaction to be one step, infinitely fast we can conclude $s.S_{fu} - S_{ox}=0$

Now the transport equation reduces to

$${d (\rho  \phi ) \over d t} + div(\rho  \phi u) = div(R_\phi. grad \phi)$$

Now defining the mixture fraction ‘f’, a non-dimensional variable in terms of ‘Φ’ we get

$f = \frac{ \phi - \phi_0}{\phi_1 - \phi_0}$

Where the suffix ‘1’ denotes the fuel stream and ‘0’ denotes oxygen stream.

If the mixture contains only oxygen the mixture fraction ‘f’ is given by the value ‘0’ and if it contains only fuel it is given by ‘1’.

Now substituting the value of ‘Φ’ in the above mixture fraction equation we get

$$f = \frac{[sm_{fu} - m_{ox}] - [sm_{fu} - m_{ox}]_0}{[sm_{fu} - m_{ox}]_1 - [sm_{fu} - m_{ox}]_0}$$

In a fuel stream [m_{fu}]_{1} = 1, [m_{ox}]_{1} = 0 and in an oxygen stream [m_{fu}]_{0} = 0, [m_{ox}]_{0} = 1

Simplifying the above equation we get

$$f = \frac{sm_{fu} - m_{ox} + m_{ox, 0}}{sm_{fu, 1} + m_{ox ,0}}$$

Now defining a new variable ‘f_{st}’, a stoichiometric mixture where there is no oxygen and fuel present in the products is given by

$$f_{st} = \frac{ m_{ox, 0}}{sm_{fu, 1} + m_{ox ,0}}$$

At fast chemical reactions

1. If there is excess of oxygen present in the reactants, there will be no fuel left in the products. Then m_{fu} = 0, m_{ox} > 0 and f < f_{st} is given by

$$f = \frac{ - m_{ox} + m_{ox, 0}}{sm_{fu, 1} + m_{ox ,0}}$$

2. If there is excess of fuel present in the reactants, there will be no oxygen left in the products. Then m_{fu} > 0, m_{ox} = 0 and f > f_{st} is given by

$$f = \frac{sm_{fu} + m_{ox, 0}}{sm_{fu, 1} + m_{ox ,0}}$$

Here ‘Φ’ is a passive scalar and it obeys the scalar transport equation. Also the mixture fraction ‘f’ is linearly related to ‘Φ ’, so it is also a passive scalar and obeys the scalar transport equation. Now the transport equation can be written as

$${d (\rho u f ) \over d t} + div(\rho  f u) = div(R_f. grad f)$$

From the initial known masses of the oxygen and fuel, we can find out the masses of these values after combustion given by

$$m_{fu} = \frac{f-f_{st} }{1-f_{st}}\left(m_{fu, 1} \right)  ,      f_{st} < f < 1          ,  m_{ox} = 0$$

$$m_{ox} = \frac{f_{st} - f }{f_{st}}\left(m_{ox, 0} \right)  ,     0< f_{st} < f         ,  m_{fu} = 0$$

There are many inert gases included with the oxygen that do not take part in the reaction. The mass fraction of these inert gases after combustion for any value of ‘f’ can be obtained from the formula

m_{in} = m_{in, 0}( 1 – f) + m_{in, 1}. f

Similarly the mass fraction of the products of combustion is obtained from

m_{pr} = 1 – (m_{fu} + m_{in} + m_{ox})

The following assumptions are made in the SCRS:

1. Single step reaction between the reactants excluding the intermediate steps.

2. A reactant which is in excess in mass fraction consumes all the other reactants stoichiometrically to form products.

The above assumptions resolve the relations between mixture fraction f and all the mass fractions. So we need to solve only one partial differential equation to calculate combustion flows rather than calculating individual partial differential equations for the mass fraction.
