= Liñán's flame speed =

In combustion, Liñán's flame speed provides the estimate of the upper limit for edge-flame propagation velocity, when the flame curvature is small. The formula is named after Amable Liñán. When the flame thickness is much smaller than the mixing-layer thickness through which the edge flame is propagating, a flame speed can be defined as the propagating speed of the flame front with respect to a region far ahead of the flame. For small flame curvatures (flame stretch), each point of the flame front propagates at a laminar planar premixed speed $S_L$ that depends on a local equivalence ratio $\phi$ just ahead of the flame. However, the flame front as a whole do not propagate at a speed $S_L$ since the mixture ahead of the flame front undergoes thermal expansion due to the heating by the flame front, that aids the flame front to propagate faster with respect to the region far ahead from the flame front. Liñán estimated the edge flame speed to be:

$$\frac{U}{S_L^0} \sim \left(\frac{\rho_u}{\rho_b}\right)^{1/2},$$

where $\rho_u$ and $\rho_b$ is the density of the fluid far upstream and far downstream of the flame front. Here $S_L^0$ is the stoichiometric value ($\phi=1$) of the planar speed. Due to the thermal expansion, streamlines diverges as it approaches the flame and a pressure builds just ahead of the flame.

The scaling law for the flame speed was verified experimentally In constant density approximation, this influence due to density variations disappear and the upper limit of the edge flame speed is given by the maximum value of $S_L$.
