= Premixed turbulent flames =

In a premixed turbulent flame, fuel and oxidizer are being mixed by turbulence during a sufficiently long time before combustion is initiated. The deposition of energy from the spark generates a flame kernel that grows at first by laminar, then by turbulent flame propagation. And in which the oxidizer has been mixed with the fuel before it reaches the flame front. This creates a thin flame front as all of the reactants are readily available.
