= Norman Riley (professor) =

British mathematician

- Education: Manchester University
- Known for: Clarke–Riley diffusion flame
- Scientific career
- Workplaces: Durham University; University of East Anglia
- Thesis: (1959)

Norman Riley is an Emeritus Professor of Applied Mathematics at the University of East Anglia in Norwich (UK).

== Biography ==
Following High School education at Calder High School, Mytholmroyd he read Mathematics at Manchester University graduating with first class honours in 1956, followed by a PhD in 1959. Norman Riley served for one year as an Assistant Lecturer at Manchester University and then spent four years as a lecturer at Durham University before he joined the then new University of East Anglia in 1964, the year that saw the first significant intake of students to the university. Promotion to Reader in 1966 was followed by promotion to a Personal Chair in 1971. He retired in 1999. Married in 1959 he has one son and one daughter.

== Research contributions ==
His research contributions in the field of fluid mechanics, over five decades, have included: unsteady flows with application to acoustic levitation and the loading on the submerged horizontal pontoons of tethered leg platforms; the aerodynamics of wings including leading-edge separation from slender wings and supercritical flow over multi-element wings; heat transfer and combustion including diffusion flames and detonation-wave generation; vortex ring dynamics; crystal growth, in particular the Czochralski crystal growth process. Throughout these investigations complementary numerical and asymptotic methods have featured.

== Books ==
- Drazin, Philip G., and Norman Riley. The Navier–Stokes equations: a classification of flows and exact solutions. No. 334. Cambridge University Press, 2006.

== See also ==
- John Frederick Clarke
