= Ernest-François Mallard =

French mineralogist (1833–1894)

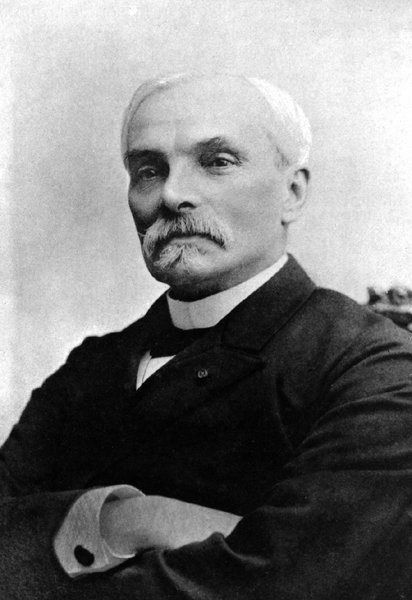
- Born: 4 February 1833
- Died: 6 July 1894 (aged 61)
- Occupation: Mineralogist
- Notable work: Laminar Flame Speed

Ernest-François Mallard (4 February 1833 – 6 July 1894) was a French mineralogist and a member of the French Academy of Sciences. He is also notable for his work with Henri Louis Le Chatelier in combustion as applied to mining safety.

== See also ==
- Thermal flame theory
- Detonation
