= Izmail Sreznevsky =

Russian philologist, Slavist, historian, paleographer, folklorist and writer

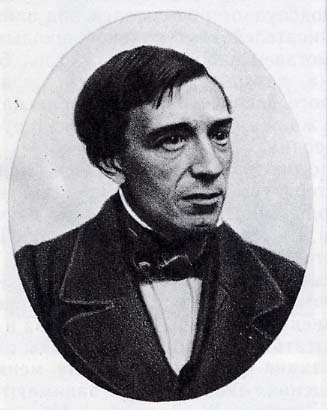
Sreznevsky in 1854

Izmail Ivanovich Sreznevsky (Russian: Измаил Иванович Срезневский; 13 June 1812 – 21 February 1880) was a Russian philologist, Slavist, historian, paleographer, folklorist, and writer.

== Life ==
His father, Ivan Sreznevsky, was a prolific translator of Latin poetry who taught at the Demidov Lyceum in Yaroslavl before moving to Kharkov University. It was in Kharkov that Sreznevsky graduated in philology (in 1829) and gained a professorship (in 1842). He was a notable figure in the Ukrainian literary revival and compiled several multi-volume anthologies of local folklore, including Zaporozhian Antiquities. In 1839–1842 he undertook a tour through every major library of Central and Eastern Europe with a view toward consulting the oldest extant Slavic manuscripts.

In 1847, Sreznevsky moved to St. Petersburg, where he applied himself to the task of preparing a comprehensive dictionary of the Old Russian language. This work spanned several decades and involved the study and publication of numerous obscure medieval texts and codices, including Codex Zographensis (in 1856), Codex Marianus (in 1866), and Kiev Fragments (in 1874). Sreznevsky's pièce de résistance, The Materials for a Dictionary of the Old Russian Language, though incomplete, was published posthumously in three volumes (1893–1903) and was reprinted with an addendum in 1912, 1958, and 1988. It was superseded only with the publication of a 24-volume academic dictionary in 1975–1999.

Sreznevsky was the founding father of the Russian Language Department of the St. Petersburg Academy of Sciences (of which he was elected a member in 1851) and the St. Petersburg academic school of Slavic studies. As early as 1849, he delivered a series of lectures on the history and evolution of the Russian language, the first such work of a scholarly type. His influential outline of Slavonic palaeography was published in 1885. A long list of his students at St. Petersburg University includes Alexander Pypin, Nikolai Chernyshevsky, Nikolay Dobrolyubov, and Vladimir Lamansky (who published his biography in 1890).

== Family ==
- Vyacheslav Sreznevsky (1849–1937) was the founder and chairman of the St. Petersburg Society of Ice Skating Amateurs (1877–1923) and the first ever chairman of the Russian Olympic Committee (1911). He helped organize the first World Figure Skating Championship (1896, St. Petersburg) and authored the first Russian reference book on photography (1883).
- Boris Sreznevsky (1857–1934) was a leading Russian/Ukrainian climatologist and meteorologist of his generation who taught at Yuryev University (now Tartu University) in 1894–1918 and was in charge of the Kiev Meteorological Observatory in 1919–1934. Boris Sreznevsky discovered the d-square law.
- Vsevolod Sreznevsky (1869–1936) was an authority on Slavic paleography that scoured Russia's northern regions in search of manuscripts and drew up a detailed account of the manuscripts held by the Russian Academy of Sciences Library (1910–1930, vol. 1–3).
