= Clarke–Riley diffusion flame =

In combustion, Clarke–Riley diffusion flame is a diffusion flame that develops inside a naturally convected boundary layer on a hot fuel surface with quiescent oxidizer environment, first studied and experimentally verified by John Frederick Clarke and Norman Riley in 1976. This problem is an extension of Emmons problem.

== See also ==
- Emmons problem
- Liñán's diffusion flame theory
