= Burke–Schumann limit =

In combustion, Burke–Schumann limit, or large Damköhler number limit, is the limit of infinitely fast chemistry (or in other words, infinite Damköhler number), named after S.P. Burke and T.E.W. Schumann, due to their pioneering work on Burke–Schumann flame. One important conclusion of infinitely fast chemistry is the non-co-existence of fuel and oxidizer simultaneously except in a thin reaction sheet. The inner structure of the reaction sheet is described by Liñán's equation.

== Limit description ==
In a typical non-premixed combustion (fuel and oxidizer are separated initially), mixing of fuel and oxidizer takes place based on the mechanical time scale $t_m$dictated by the convection/diffusion (the relative importance between convection and diffusion depends on the Reynolds number) terms. Similarly, chemical reaction takes certain amount of time $t_c$ to consume reactants. For one-step irreversible chemistry with Arrhenius rate, this chemical time is given by

$$t_c = \left(B e^{\frac E {RT}}\right)^{-1}$$

where B is the pre-exponential factor, E is the activation energy, R is the universal gas constant and T is the temperature. Similarly, one can define $t_m$ appropriate for particular flow configuration. The Damköhler number is then

$$\mathrm{Da} = \frac{t_m}{t_c} = t_m B e^{-\frac E {RT}}.$$

Due to the large activation energy, the Damköhler number at unburnt gas temperature $T_u$ is $\mathrm{Da}_u \ll 1$, because $\frac E {RT_u} \sim 100$. On the other hand, the shortest chemical time is found at the flame (with burnt gas temperature $T_b$), leading to $\mathrm{Da}_b \gg 1$. Regardless of Reynolds number, the limit $\mathrm{Da}_b\rightarrow \infty$ guarantees that chemical reaction dominates over the other terms. A typical conservation equation for the scalar $\psi$ (species concentration or energy) takes the following form,

$$\mathcal{L}(\psi) = \mathrm{Da}_b Y_F Y_O e^{-\frac E {RT}+\frac E {RT_b}}$$

where $\mathcal{L}$ is the convective-diffusive operator and $Y_F\ \&\ Y_O$ are the mass fractions of fuel and oxidizer, respectively. Taking the limit $\mathrm{Da}_b\rightarrow\infty$ in the above equation, we find that

$$Y_F Y_O =0,$$

i.e., fuel and oxidizer cannot coexist, since far away from the reaction sheet, only one of the reactant is available (non premixed). On the fuel side of the reaction sheet, $Y_O=0$ and on the oxidizer side, $Y_F=0$. Fuel and oxygen can coexist (with very small concentrations) only in a thin reaction sheet, where $\mathrm{Da}\sim O(1)$ (diffusive transport will be comparable to reaction in this zone). In this thin reaction sheet, both fuel and oxygen are consumed and nothing leaks to the other side of the sheet. Due to the instantaneous consumption of fuel and oxidizer, the normal gradients of scalars exhibit discontinuities at the reaction sheet.

== See also ==
- Activation energy asymptotics
- Liñán's equation
- Liñán's diffusion flame theory
