= Gerhard Damköhler =

German chemist (1908–1944)

- Born: 16 March 1908; Klingenmunster, Germany
- Died: 30 March 1944 (aged 36)
- Scientific career
- Fields: Chemical Engineering, Fluid Dynamics, Thermodynamics

Gerhard Damköhler (16 March 1908 – 30 March 1944) was a German chemist. From 1936 to 1944, Damköhler was the head of chemical reaction engineering at the Institute of Physical Chemistry in Göttingen. Damköhler numbers are named after Damköhler, as is the Gerhard Damköhler medal awarded by the German Association of Chemical and Process Engineering (DVCV).

== Biography ==
Gerhard Damköhler was born on 16 March 1908 in Klingenmunster in West Central Germany, the son of a physician. Following the usual primary and gymnasium education, he enrolled in the summer of 1926 at the Ludwig-Maximilians-Universität München to study chemistry with A. Sommerfeld, graduating five years later summa cum laude with a doctor of philosophy for a dissertation entitled "Individuality of the Osmotic Behavior of Alkalihalogenides." He remained at the Ludwig-Maximilians-Universität München for three more years as a grant supported research fellow, during which time he began to display a marked ability for developing and applying analytical methods to practical problems in chemical engineering. This work attracted the notice of Arnold Eucken, the director of the University of Göttingen's Institute of Physical Chemistry, who offered Damköhler a position as an assistant that he took up in December 1934. Damköhler took his own life on 30 March 1944. Part of the reason was the political pressure put on him to contribute to the Luftwaffe's jet engine development program.

== Personal life ==
Damköhler was described as a highly intelligent man who worked "25 hours a day". He was married for seven years and had no children.

== Published work ==
- The Effect of Turbulence on the Flame Velocity in Gas Mixtures
