= Emmons problem =

In combustion, Emmons problem describes the flame structure which develops inside the boundary layer, created by a flowing oxidizer stream on flat fuel (solid or liquid) surfaces. The problem was first studied by Howard Wilson Emmons in 1956. The flame is of diffusion flame type because it separates fuel and oxygen by a flame sheet. The corresponding problem in a quiescent oxidizer environment is known as Clarke–Riley diffusion flame.

== Burning rate ==
Consider a semi-infinite fuel surface with leading edge located at $x=0$ and let the free stream oxidizer velocity be $U_\infty$. Through the solution $f(\eta)$ of Blasius equation $f'''+ff''=0$ ($\eta$ is the self-similar Howarth–Dorodnitsyn coordinate), the mass flux $\rho v$ ($\rho$ is density and $v$ is vertical velocity) in the vertical direction can be obtained

$$\rho v = \rho_\infty \mu_\infty \sqrt{\frac{2\xi}{U_\infty}} \left(f'\rho \int_0^\eta \rho^{-1} \ d\eta - f\right),$$

where

$$\xi = \int_0^x \rho_\infty \mu_\infty \ dx.$$

In deriving this, it is assumed that the density $\rho \sim 1/T$ and the viscosity $\mu \sim T$, where $T$ is the temperature. The subscript $\infty$ describes the values far away from the fuel surface. The main interest in combustion process is the fuel burning rate, which is obtained by evaluating $\rho v$ at $\eta=0$, as given below,

$$\rho_o v_o = \rho_\infty \mu_\infty \left[\frac{2U_\infty}{\mu_\infty^2}\int_0^x \rho_\infty \mu_\infty \ dx\right]^{-1/2} [-f(0)].$$

== See also ==
- Liñán's diffusion flame theory
