= Heat release parameter =

In combustion, heat release parameter (or gas expansion parameter) is a dimensionless parameter which measures the amount of heat released by an adiabatic combustion process. It is defined as

$$q = \frac{T_{ad}-T_u}{T_u}$$

where

- $T_{ad}$ is the adiabatic flame temperature
- $T_u$ is the unburnt mixture temperature.

In typical combustion process, $q\approx 2-7$. For isobaric combustion, using ideal gas law, the parameter can be expressed in terms of density, i.e.,

$$q = \frac{T_{ad}-T_u}{T_u} = \frac{\rho_u-\rho_{ad}}{\rho_u}.$$

The ratio of burnt gas to unburnt gas temperature is

$$\frac{T_{ad}}{T_u} =1+q.$$

== Gas expansion ratio ==
The gas expansion ratio is simply defined by

$$r = \frac{\rho_u}{\rho_b}$$

which is related to $\alpha$ by $r=1+q.$

== See also ==
- Zel'dovich number
