= Wobbe index =

Indicator of the interchangeability of fuel gases

The Wobbe index (WI) or Wobbe number is an indicator of the interchangeability of fuel gases such as natural gas, liquefied petroleum gas (LPG), and town gas and is frequently defined in the specifications of gas supply and transport utilities.

If $V_C$ is the higher heating value, or higher calorific value, and $G_S$ is the specific gravity, the Wobbe index, $I_W$, is defined as:

$$I_W = \frac {V_C} {\sqrt{G_S}}.$$

$$G_S = \frac{\rho_{STP}}{\rho_{air,STP}} = \frac{M}{M_{air}}$$

$\rho_{STP}$ is the density of the gas at standard conditions, the definition of which changed in 1982. Published Wobbe data may be using 0 °C, 15 °C, 15.56 °C, 20 °C or 25 °C. EU directives on gas quality use 15 °C in accordance with ISO 13443 and ISO 6976.

$\rho_{air,STP}$ is the density of air at standard conditions, $M$ is the molar mass of the gas and $M_{air}$ is the molar mass of air which is about 28.96 kg/kmol.

The Wobbe index is used to compare the combustion energy output of different composition fuel gases in an appliance (fire, cooker etc.). If two fuels have identical Wobbe indices then for given pressure and valve settings the energy output will also be identical. Typically variations of up to 5% are allowed as these would not be noticeable to the consumer.

The Wobbe index is a critical factor to minimise the impact of the changeover when analyzing the use of substitute natural gas (SNG) fuels such as propane-air mixtures. The Wobbe index also requires the addition of propane to some upgraded biomethane products, particularly in regions where natural gas has a high calorific value such as Sweden.

The Wobbe index has its origins in the 1920's with Italian physicist and engineer Goffredo Wobbe.

== Wobbe index of common fuel gases ==
Note that these Wobbe numbers below are not calculated at 15 °C and so are not correct according to ISO 13443, see Standard temperature and pressure.

Fuel gas	Upper index kcal/Nm³	Lower index kcal/Nm³	Upper index MJ/m³	Lower index MJ/m³
Hydrogen	11,528	9,715	48.23	40.65
Methane	12,735	11,452	53.28	47.91
Ethane	16,298	14,931	68.19	62.47
Ethylene	15,253	14,344	63.82	60.01
Natural gas	12,837	11,597	53.71	48.52
Propane	19,376	17,817	81.07	74.54
Propylene	18,413	17,180	77.04	71.88
n-butane	22,066	20,336	92.32	85.08
Iso-butane	21,980	20,247	91.96	84.71
Butylene-1	21,142	19,728	88.46	82.54
LPG	20,755	19,106	86.84	79.94
Acetylene	14,655	14,141	61.32	59.16
Carbon monoxide	3,060	3,060	12.80	12.80

Note: 1 Joule = 2.3901×10^{−4} kcal.

== Usage ==
The Wobbe index is expressed in MJ/Nm³ (where 'Nm³' indicates 'm³ in Normal conditions'), or sometimes in BTU/scf. In the case of natural gas (molar mass 17 g/mol), the typical heating value is around 39 MJ/Nm³ (1,050 BTU/scf) and the specific gravity is approximately 0.59, giving a typical Wobbe index of 51 MJ/Nm³ (1,367 BTU/scf).

There are three ranges or "families" of fuel gases that have been internationally agreed based on Wobbe index. Family 1 covers manufactured gases, family 2 covers natural gases (with high and low ranges) and family 3 covers liquefied petroleum gas (LPG). Combustion equipment is typically designed to burn a fuel gas within a particular family: hydrogen-rich town gas, natural gas or LPG.

Family	Type of gas	Wobbe index range (MJ/Nm^{3})	Wobbe number range
1	Town gas / Syngas	22.5 – 30.0	24.0 – 29.0
2 L	Natural	39.0 – 45.0	
2 H		45.5 – 55.0	48.0 – 53.0
3	LPG	73.5 – 87.5	72.0 – 87.0

Other flame characteristics and composition limits may determine the acceptability of the replacement gas, e.g. flame speed, "yellow tipping" due to incomplete combustion, sulfur content, oxygen content, etc.

== Limitations ==
In spite of its usefulness, Wobbe index alone is not a good indicator of the interchangeability of two or more gases, or mixtures of them. It is necessary to bear in mind other criteria while determining the plenty substitution of a fuel by other, different of the one used to adjust the burning system.
