= Flame speed =

Expansion rate of a flame front in a combustion

The flame speed is the measured rate of expansion of the flame front in a combustion reaction. Whereas flame velocity is generally used for a fuel, a related term is explosive velocity, which is the same relationship measured for an explosive. Combustion engineers differentiate between the laminar flame speed and turbulent flame speed. Flame speed is typically measured in m/s, cm/s, etc.

== In engines ==
In an internal combustion engine, the flame speed of a fuel is a property which determines its ability to undergo controlled combustion without detonation. Flame speed is used along with adiabatic flame temperature to help determine the engine's efficiency. According to one source,

"...high flame-speed combustion processes, which closely approximate constant-volume processes, should reflect in high efficiencies."

The flame speeds are not the actual engine flame speeds, A 12:1 compression ratio gasoline engine at 1500 rpm would have a flame speed of about 16.5 m/s, and a similar hydrogen engine yields 48.3 m/s, but such engine flame speeds are also very dependent on stoichiometry

== See also ==
- Chemical kinetics
- Deflagration
- G-Equation
- Burn rate (chemistry)
- Wobbe index
- Octane rating
