= Mixture fraction =

Mixture fraction ($Z$) is a quantity used in combustion studies that measures the mass fraction of one stream of a mixture formed by two feed streams, one the fuel stream and the other the oxidizer stream. Both the feed streams are allowed to have inert gases. The mixture fraction definition is usually normalized such that it approaches unity in the fuel stream and zero in the oxidizer stream. The mixture-fraction variable is commonly used as a replacement for the physical coordinate normal to the flame surface, in nonpremixed combustion.

== Definition ==
Assume a two-stream problem having one portion of the boundary the fuel stream with fuel mass fraction $Y_F=Y_{F,F}$ and another portion of the boundary the oxidizer stream with oxidizer mass fraction $Y_{O}=Y_{O,O}$. For example, if the oxidizer stream is air and the fuel stream contains only the fuel, then $Y_{O,O}=0.232$ and $Y_{F,F}=1$. In addition, assume there is no oxygen in the fuel stream and there is no fuel in the oxidizer stream. Let $s$ be the mass of oxygen required to burn unit mass of fuel (for hydrogen gas, $s=8$ and for $\mathrm{C}_m\mathrm{H}_n$ alkanes, $s=32(m+n/4)/(12m+n)$). Introduce the scaled mass fractions as $y_F=Y_F/Y_{F,F}$ and $y_O = Y_O/Y_{O,O}$. Then the mixture fraction is defined as

$$Z = \frac{Sy_F-y_{O}+1}{S+1}$$

where

$$S = \frac{sY_{F,F}}{Y_{O,O}}$$

is the stoichiometry parameter, also known as the overall equivalence ratio. On the fuel-stream boundary, $y_F=1$ and $y_O=0$ since there is no oxygen in the fuel stream, and hence $Z=1$. Similarly, on the oxidizer-stream boundary, $y_F=0$ and $y_O=1$ so that $Z=0$. Anywhere else in the mixing domain, $0<Z<1$. The mixture fraction is a function of both the spatial coordinates $\mathbf{x}$ and the time $t$, i.e., $Z=Z(\mathbf{x},t).$

Within the mixing domain, there are level surfaces where fuel and oxygen are found to be mixed in stoichiometric proportion. This surface is special in combustion because this is where a diffusion flame resides. Constant level of this surface is identified from the equation $Z(\mathbf{x},t)=Z_s$, where $Z_s$ is called as the stoichiometric mixture fraction which is obtained by setting $Y_F=Y_{O}=0$ (since if they were react to consume fuel and oxygen, only on the stoichiometric locations both fuel and oxygen will be consumed completely) in the definition of $Z$ to obtain

$$Z_s = \frac{1}{S+1}$$.

== Relation between local equivalence ratio and mixture fraction ==
When there is no chemical reaction, or considering the unburnt side of the flame, the mass fraction of fuel and oxidizer are $y_{F,u}= Z$ and $y_{O,u}= 1- Z$ (the subscript $u$ denotes unburnt mixture). This allows to define a local fuel-air equivalence ratio $\phi$

$$\phi= \frac{sY_{F,u}}{Y_{O,u}}=\frac{Sy_{F,u}}{y_{O,u}}.$$

The local equivalence ratio is an important quantity for partially premixed combustion. The relation between local equivalence ratio and mixture fraction is given by

$$\phi = \frac{SZ}{1-Z} \qquad \Rightarrow \qquad Z = \frac{\phi}{S+\phi}.$$

The stoichiometric mixture fraction $Z_s$ defined earlier is the location where the local equivalence ratio $\phi=1$.

== Scalar dissipation rate ==
In turbulent combustion, a quantity called the scalar dissipation rate $\chi$ with dimensional units of that of an inverse time is used to define a characteristic diffusion time. Its definition is given by

$$\chi = 2 D |\nabla Z|^2$$

where $D$ is the diffusion coefficient of the scalar. Its stoichiometric value is $\chi_s = 2D_s|\nabla Z|^2_s$.

== Liñán's mixture fraction ==
Amable Liñán introduced a modified mixture fraction in 1991 that is appropriate for systems where the fuel and oxidizer have different Lewis numbers. If $Le_F$ and $Le_{O_2}$ are the Lewis number of the fuel and oxidizer, respectively, then Liñán's mixture fraction is defined as

$$\tilde Z = \frac{\tilde Sy_F-y_{O}+1}{\tilde S+1}$$

where

$$\tilde S = \frac{Le_O S}{Le_F}.$$

The stoichiometric mixture fraction $\tilde Z_s$ is given by

$$\tilde Z_s = \frac{1}{\tilde S+1}$$.
