= Activation energy asymptotics =

Asymptotic analysis of combustion

Activation energy asymptotics (AEA), also known as large activation energy asymptotics, is an asymptotic analysis used in the combustion field utilizing the fact that the reaction rate is extremely sensitive to temperature changes due to the large activation energy of the chemical reaction.

== History ==
The techniques were pioneered by the Russian scientists Yakov Borisovich Zel'dovich, David A. Frank-Kamenetskii and co-workers in the 30s, in their study on premixed flames and thermal explosions (Frank-Kamenetskii theory), but not popular to western scientists until the 70s. In the early 70s, due to the pioneering work of Williams B. Bush, Francis E. Fendell, Forman A. Williams, Amable Liñán and John F. Clarke, it became popular in western community and since then it was widely used to explain more complicated problems in combustion.

== Method overview ==
In combustion processes, the reaction rate $\omega$ is dependent on temperature $T$ in the following form (Arrhenius law),

$$\omega(T) \propto \mathrm{e}^{-E_{\rm a}/RT},$$

where $E_{\rm a}$ is the activation energy, and $R$ is the universal gas constant. In general, the condition $E_{\rm a}/R \gg T_b$ is satisfied, where $T_{\rm b}$ is the burnt gas temperature. This condition forms the basis for activation energy asymptotics. Denoting $T_{\rm u}$ for unburnt gas temperature, one can define the Zel'dovich number and heat release parameter as follows

$$\beta = \frac{E_{\rm a}}{RT_{\rm b}}\frac{T_{\rm b}-T_{\rm u}}{T_{\rm b}}, \quad q = \frac{T_{\rm b}-T_{\rm u}}{T_{\rm u}}.$$

In addition, if we define a non-dimensional temperature

$$\theta = \frac{T-T_{\rm u}}{T_{\rm b}-T_{\rm u}},$$

such that $\theta$ approaching zero in the unburnt region and approaching unity in the burnt gas region (in other words, $0\leq\theta\leq 1$), then the ratio of reaction rate at any temperature to reaction rate at burnt gas temperature is given by

$$\frac{\omega(T)}{\omega(T_{\rm b})} \propto \frac{\mathrm{e}^{-E_{\rm a}/RT}}{\mathrm{e}^{-E_{\rm a}/RT_{\rm b}}} = \exp \left[-\beta(1-\theta)\frac{1+q}{1+q\theta}\right].$$

Now in the limit of $\beta\rightarrow \infty$ (large activation energy) with $q\sim O(1)$, the reaction rate is exponentially small i.e., $O(e^{-\beta})$ and negligible everywhere, but non-negligible when $\beta(1-\theta) \sim O(1)$. In other words, the reaction rate is negligible everywhere, except in a small region very close to burnt gas temperature, where $1-\theta \sim O(1/\beta)$. Thus, in solving the conservation equations, one identifies two different regimes, at leading order,

- Outer convective-diffusive zone
- Inner reactive-diffusive layer

where in the convective-diffusive zone, reaction term will be neglected and in the thin reactive-diffusive layer, convective terms can be neglected and the solutions in these two regions are stitched together by matching slopes using method of matched asymptotic expansions. The above-mentioned two regime are true only at leading order since the next order corrections may involve all the three transport mechanisms.

== See also ==
- Zeldovich–Frank-Kamenetskii equation
- Burke–Schumann limit
