= Castrillo de Cabrera =

Castrillo de Cabrera Castriellu de Cabreira
- Flag Coat of arms

- Location within Castile and León Location within Spain
- Coordinates: 42°20′25″N 6°32′39″W
- Country: Spain
- Autonomous community: Castile and León
- Province: León
- Municipality: Castrillo de Cabrera

Government
  - Mayor: Tomás Blanco Voces (PSOE)

Area
  - Total: 115.87 km^{2} (44.74 sq mi)
- Elevation: 1,051 m (3,448 ft)

Population (2025-01-01)
  - Total: 100
  - Density: 0.86/km^{2} (2.2/sq mi)
- Demonym(s): cabreirés, cabreiresa
- Time zone: UTC+1 (CET)
  - Summer (DST): UTC+2 (CEST)
- Postal Code: 24742
- Telephone prefix: 987

Castrillo de Cabrera (Spanish pronunciation: [kasˈtɾiʎo ðe kaˈβɾeɾa]), Castriellu de Cabreira in Leonese language, is a municipality located in the province of León, Castile and León, Spain. According to the 2010 census (INE), the municipality has a population of 152 inhabitants spread over the six villages that make up the municipality. Those six villages are Castrillo de Cabrera, the municipal seat, Marrubio (Manrubiu), Noceda de Cabrera (Ñoceda de Cabreira), Nogar (Ñugare), Odollo (Udoyu) and Saceda (Saceda).

== Language ==
Leonese language is widely spoken in all the shire because of the isolation this area has experienced - and still does - through the years, making it easier for the language to survive than in other areas in the province of León.

== See also ==
- Leonese language
