= Colegio Marista San José =

School in León, Spain

- Álvaro López Núñez Avenue, 12; León, Spain, León; Spain

Information
- Type: Marist Brothers, Catholic
- Established: 1951; 75 years ago
- Administrator: Mónica del Cano Miquel
- Headmaster: Sergio Luis Mato Canedo
- Gender: Coeducational
- Age range: Three through eighteen
- Enrollment: 1370 (capacity)
- Colors: Violet, Blue
- Athletics: Handball
- National ranking: 116th best school in Spain according to El Mundo (2022).
- Website: MaristasSanJose

Colegio Marista San José is a comprehensive school, ages three to eighteen, in León, Spain. It continues to be run by the Marist Brothers who opened it in 1951.

On October 12, 29 Marist Brothers opened the school to 1106 students. The enrollment capacity in 2015 was given as infant education (225), primary (450), secondary (357), baccalaureate science and technology (198) and humanities and social sciences (140).
