= D-square law =

The d-square law or $d^2$-law is a relationship between diameter and time for an isolated, spherical droplet when it evaporates quasi-steadily, which was first observed by Boris Sreznevsky in 1882, and was explained by Irving Langmuir in 1918. If $d(t)$ and $t$ are the droplet diameter and time, then $d^2$-law pertains to the relation

$$d_0^2 - d^2 = K (t-t_0),$$

where $t_0$ is the initial time, $d_0=d(t_0)$ is the initial droplet diameter and $K$ is called the evaporation constant.

== Crespo–Liñán correction ==
Crespo–Liñán correction refers to a small correction of the order $1/\sqrt{\varepsilon}$ to the d-square law in terms of the small parameter $\varepsilon = \rho_g/\rho_l\ll 1$, the ratio of gas to liquid density. Antonio Crespo and Amable Liñán showed that the quasi-steady approximation is correct in the inner zone having the size on the order of droplet diameter, but becomes invalid in an outer zone with a size larger than the droplet diameter by the factor of $1/\sqrt{\varepsilon}$, where the unsteady terms cannot be neglected.
