= Millán Millán =

Millán Muñoz Millán
- Born: 1941; Granada, Spain
- Died: January 12, 2024; Valencia, Spain
- Education: University of Toronto
- Occupation: Scientist
- Scientific career
- Fields: Atmospheric physics, Atmospheric environmental research, Climate change
- Workplaces: CEAM
- Thesis: A study of the operational characteristics and optimization procedures of dispersive correlation spectrometers for the detection of trace gases in the atmosphere (1972)
- Academic advisors: R. E. Munn

Millán Millán was the director of the Centro de Estudios Ambientales del Mediterráneo (CEAM) and was one of the main environmental assessors for the European Union.

== Life ==
He graduated from the University of Toronto with a BASc in 1967, an MASc in 1969, and a Ph.D. in Atmospheric Physics and Spectroscopy in 1972, and from the School of Engineering, Bilbao with a Dr. Ing. Industrial Engineering in 1986.

== Work ==
=== In Industry ===
From 1966 he worked at Barringer Research Ltd in Toronto, specializing in design of instruments for geological exploration. While working there he designed electro-magnetic reels to measure nickel sulfide at a mine. Following the Munich terrorist attacks the design was adapted for metal detectors, and is still used in airports today.

==== COSPEC ====
From 1967 he designed electro-optical instruments to measure gases in industrial processes, and in 1968-1970 he designed the COSPEC (COrrelation SPECtrometer) instrument to measure pollutant plumes in the atmosphere. This work was financed by NASA, and was used as his thesis in atmospheric physics. COSPEC was the first commercial instrument to measure remote atmospheric contaminants in movement in real time. It received many prizes and was given the IR-100 for ‘One of the best instrumental designs in 1970' by the Nobel Prize panel in Boston. COSPEC appears in the Encyclopædia Britannica, is currently used in more than 40 countries, and has more than 500 scientific references, including journals such as Science and Nature. It has also appeared in the movie Dante's Peak and the BBC documentary Surviving St. Helen's, and remains widely used in Volcanology.

=== Other Work ===
In 1972, Millán began working for the National Meteorological Center of Canada, responsible for the study of contaminant dispersion in the atmosphere. In 1973, he was asked by the European Commission to be its main advisor on environment and climate. He studied and optimized the system of atmospheric dispersion and contaminant measurement of the Netherlands, Belgium, Germany and RDA. He co-organized six campaigns of atmospheric contaminants in Europe from 1974-1983. From 1974, he was named adviser “ad personam” of the European Community, choosing the science priorities of the 3rd, 4th, 5th and 6th Marco programs.

Millán was the first person to measure the dispersal of a contaminant plume more than 400 km in 1976. This was fundamental for the realisation that atmospheric contamination is not limited by the small area in which it is produced, but affects – to varying degrees – the entire planet.

=== CEAM ===
From 1991 to 2012, he was the director of the CEAM (Center of Environmental Studies of the Mediterranean) supervising 90 investigators. He was considered a specialist of the Mediterranean basin and of climate change processes of the Mediterranean coast.

He coordinated various I+D (Investigation and development) programs in the European Community, from NATO / CCMS air pollution modelling, and was a member of the board of directors of the European Science Foundation from 2003. He was named Doctor Honoris Causa by the University of Elche in 2009.
