= Zeldovich number =

Dimensionless parameter in fluid mechanics

The Zeldovich number is a dimensionless number which provides a quantitative measure for the activation energy of a chemical reaction which appears in the Arrhenius exponent, named after the Russian scientist Yakov Borisovich Zeldovich, who along with David A. Frank-Kamenetskii, first introduced in their paper in 1938. In 1983, ICDERS meeting at Poitiers, it was decided that the non-dimensional number will be named after Zeldovich.

It is defined as

$$\beta = \frac {E_a} {RT_b} \cdot \frac{T_b-T_u}{T_b}$$

where

- $E_a$ is the activation energy of the reaction
- $R$ is the universal gas constant
- $T_b$ is the burnt gas temperature
- $T_u$ is the unburnt mixture temperature.

In terms of heat release parameter $q$, it is given by

$$\beta = \frac{E_a}{RT_b} \frac{q}{1+q}$$

For typical combustion phenomena, the value for Zel'dovich number lies in the range $\beta\approx 8-20$. Activation energy asymptotics uses this number as the large parameter of expansion.
