= Flamelet generated manifold =

Flamelet-Generated Manifold (FGM) is a combustion chemistry reduction technique. The approach of FGM is based on the idea that the most important aspects of the internal structure of the flame front should be taken into account. In this view, a low-dimensional chemical manifold is created on the basis of one-dimensional flame structures, including nearly all of the transport and chemical phenomena as observed in three-dimensional flames. In addition, the progress of the flame is generally described by transport equations for a limited number of control variables.

== See also ==
- Combustion models for CFD
