= Fuel mass fraction =

In combustion physics, fuel mass fraction is the ratio of fuel mass flow to the total mass flow of a fuel mixture. If an air flow is fuel free, the fuel mass fraction is zero; in pure fuel without trapped gases, the ratio is unity. As fuel is burned in a combustion process, the fuel mass fraction is reduced. The definition reads as

$$Y_F = \frac{m_F}{m_{\rm{tot}}}$$

where

- $m_F$ is the mass of the fuel in the mixture
- $m_{\rm{tot}}$ is the total mass of the mixture
