= Gregorio Millán Barbany =

Gregorio Millán Barbany (4 April 1919, Barcelona – 26 November 2004, Madrid) was an aeronautical engineer and professor at the Escuela Técnica Superior de Ingenieros Aeronautics (ETSI Aeronáuticos, Higher Technical School of Aeronautical Engineers) of the Technical University of Madrid (Universidad Politécnica de Madrid, UPM).

== Biography ==
After completing his baccalaureate studies at Molina de Aragón in the Province of Guadalajara and at Madrid, he matriculated at Madrid's Military Academy of Aeronautical Engineers, where in 1945 he finished his doctoral studies and won an award for his doctoral dissertation. He held, from 1945 to 1951, the chair of theoretical aerodynamics at the Military Academy of Aeronautical Engineers and, from 1951 to 1957, the chair of fluid mechanics and aerodynamics at the ETSI Aeronáuticos.

In October 1948 Theodore von Kármán was invited by the Instituto Nacional de Técnica Aeronáutica (INTA) to give a series of conferences, during which he met Millán and they starting a close professional and personal relationship. At the Sorbonne University in Paris during the academic year 1951–1952, von Kármán gave a seminar, in which Millán collaborated. At the California Institute of Technology, Millán worked with von Kármán and did research in aerothermochemistry. In Madrid in the 1950s Millán created and directed, within INTA, a research group of Spanish professors and engineers known as the Combustion Group, which did research on combustion in jet engines (specifically, theory of laminar flames; theoretical and experimental study of droplet combustion; and theoretical study of jet combustion). He presented research papers at conferences in various centers in France and the USA. Appointed Director General of Technical Education in the Ministry of National Education, he was responsible for the reform of technical education, mandated by the law of July 20, 1957. In 1958 his book Aerothermochemistry was published. Under the auspices of the US Department of Agriculture, Millán studied prevention of forest fires.

He was president since 1961 of the Sociedad Española de Construcciones Babcock-Wilcox (which in 1977 went through a severe crisis during his presidency) and of Babcock & Wilcox of Portugal. In October 1968 he was elected president of the Asociación de Ingenieros Aeronáuticos de España (Association of Aeronautical Engineers of Spain), a position that he held until March 1972.

In 1958, the Combustion Group received the “Francisco Franco” prize for scientific research for its work on combustion. In 1961 he was elected a member of the Real Academia de Ciencias Exactas, Físicas y Naturales (Royal Academy of Exact, Physical and Natural Sciences). In 1999 he received the AENA Foundation Award for his entire career in the field of aeronautics.

In 2007 the Universidad Carlos III de Madrid created in his honor the "Gregorio Millán Barbany" Institute for Modeling and Simulation in Fluid Dynamics, Nanoscience and Industrial Mathematics.

In 1948 Millán married Carmen de la Torre Bernal. They had a daughter Marta and a son Teodoro, named after Gregorio Millán's teacher Theodore von Kármán.
