= Adiabatic flame temperature =

Temperature reached by a flame under ideal conditions

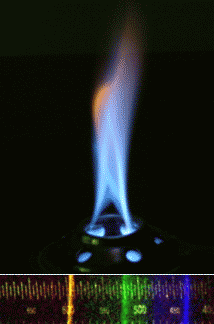
Ethanol burning with its spectrum depicted

In the study of combustion, the adiabatic flame temperature is the temperature reached by a flame under ideal conditions. It is an upper bound of the temperature that is reached in actual processes.

There are two types of adiabatic flame temperature: constant volume and constant pressure, depending on how the process is completed. The constant volume adiabatic flame temperature is the temperature that results from a complete combustion process that occurs without any work, heat transfer or changes in kinetic or potential energy. Its temperature is higher than in the constant pressure process because no energy is utilized to change the volume of the system (i.e., generate work).

== Common flames ==
Propane

Iso-Octane (2,2,4-Trimethylpentane)

In daily life, the vast majority of flames one encounters are those caused by rapid oxidation of hydrocarbons and other organic compounds in materials such as wood, wax, fat, plastics, propane, and gasoline. The constant-pressure adiabatic flame temperature of such substances in air is in a relatively narrow range around 1,950 °C (2,220 K; 3,540 °F). This is mostly because the heat of combustion of these compounds is roughly proportional to the amount of oxygen consumed, which proportionally increases the amount of air that has to be heated, so the effect of a larger heat of combustion on the flame temperature is offset. Incomplete reaction at higher temperature further curtails the effect of a larger heat of combustion.

Because most combustion processes that happen naturally occur in the open air, there is nothing that confines the gas to a particular volume like the cylinder in an engine. As a result, these substances will burn at a constant pressure, which allows the gas to expand during the process.

== Common flame temperatures ==
Assuming initial atmospheric conditions (1 bar and 20 °C), the following table lists the flame temperature for various fuels under constant pressure conditions. The temperatures mentioned here are for a stoichiometric fuel-oxidizer mixture (i.e. equivalence ratio φ = 1).

These are theoretical, not actual, flame temperatures produced by a flame that loses no heat. The closest will be the hottest part of a flame, where the combustion reaction is most efficient. This also assumes complete combustion (e.g. perfectly balanced, non-smoky, usually bluish flame). Several values in the table significantly disagree with the literature or predictions by online calculators.

Adiabatic flame temperature (constant pressure) of common fuels
Fuel	Oxidizer 1 bar 20 °C	$T_\text{ad}$	
Fuel	Oxidizer 1 bar 20 °C	(°C)	(°F)
Acetylene (C_{2}H_{2})	Air	2,500	4,532
Acetylene (C_{2}H_{2})	Oxygen	3,480	6,296
Butane (C_{4}H_{10})	Air	2,231	4,074
Cyanogen (C_{2}N_{2})	Oxygen	4,525	8,177
Dicyanoacetylene (C_{4}N_{2})	Oxygen	4,990	9,010
Ethane (C_{2}H_{6})	Air	1,955	3,551
Ethanol (C_{2}H_{5}OH)	Air	2,082	3,779
Gasoline	Air	2,138	3,880
Hydrogen (H_{2})	Air	2,254	4,089
Magnesium (Mg)	Air	1,982	3,600
Methane (CH_{4})	Air	1,963	3,565
Methanol (CH_{3}OH)	Air	1,949	3,540
Natural gas	Air	1,960	3,562
Pentane (C_{5}H_{12})	Air	1,977	3,591
Propane (C_{3}H_{8})	Air	1,980	3,596
Methylacetylene (CH_{3}CCH)	Air	2,010	3,650
Methylacetylene (CH_{3}CCH)	Oxygen	2,927	5,301
Toluene (C_{7}H_{8})	Air	2,071	3,760
Wood	Air	1,980	3,596
Kerosene	Air	2,093	3,801
Light fuel oil	Air	2,104	3,820
Medium fuel oil	Air	2,101	3,815
Heavy fuel oil	Air	2,102	3,817
Bituminous coal	Air	2,172	3,943
Anthracite	Air	2,180	3,957
Anthracite	Oxygen	≈3,500	≈6,332
Aluminium	Oxygen	3,732	6,750
Lithium	Oxygen	2,438	4,420
Phosphorus (white)	Oxygen	2,969	5,376
Zirconium	Oxygen	4,005	7,241

== Thermodynamics ==
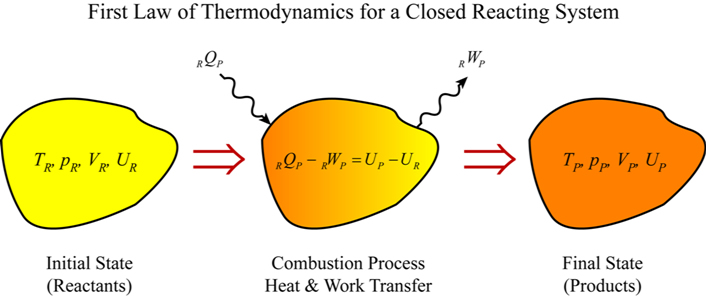
First law of thermodynamics for a closed reacting system

From the first law of thermodynamics for a closed reacting system we have

$${}_RQ_P  - {}_RW_P  = U_P  - U_R$$

where, ${}_RQ_P$ and ${}_RW_P$ are the heat and work transferred from the system to the surroundings during the process, respectively, and $U_R$ and $U_P$ are the internal energy of the reactants and products, respectively. In the constant volume adiabatic flame temperature case, the volume of the system is held constant and hence there is no work occurring:

$${}_RW_P  = \int\limits_R^P {pdV}  = 0$$

There is also no heat transfer because the process is defined to be adiabatic: ${}_RQ_P = 0$. As a result, the internal energy of the products is equal to the internal energy of the reactants: $U_P = U_R$. Because this is a closed system, the mass of the products and reactants is constant and the first law can be written on a mass basis,

$$U_P  = U_R  \Rightarrow m_P u_P  = m_R u_R  \Rightarrow u_P  = u_R$$.

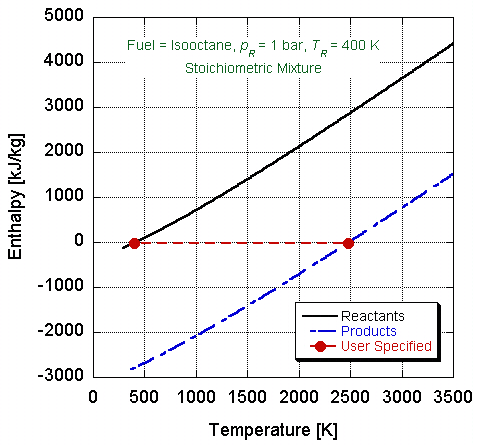
Enthalpy versus temperature diagram illustrating closed system calculation

In the case of the constant pressure adiabatic flame temperature, the pressure of the system is held constant, which results in the following equation for the work:

$${}_RW_P  = \int\limits_R^P {pdV}  = p\left( {V_P  - V_R } \right)$$

Again there is no heat transfer occurring because the process is defined to be adiabatic: ${}_RQ_P = 0$. From the first law, we find that,

$$- p\left( {V_P  - V_R } \right) = U_P  - U_R  \Rightarrow U_P  + pV_P  = U_R  + pV_R$$

Recalling the definition of enthalpy we obtain $H_P = H_R$. Because this is a closed system, the mass of the products and reactants is the same and the first law can be written on a mass basis:

$$H_P  = H_R  \Rightarrow m_P h_P  = m_R h_R  \Rightarrow h_P  = h_R$$.

We see that the adiabatic flame temperature of the constant pressure process is lower than that of the constant volume process. This is because some of the energy released during combustion goes, as work, into changing the volume of the control system.

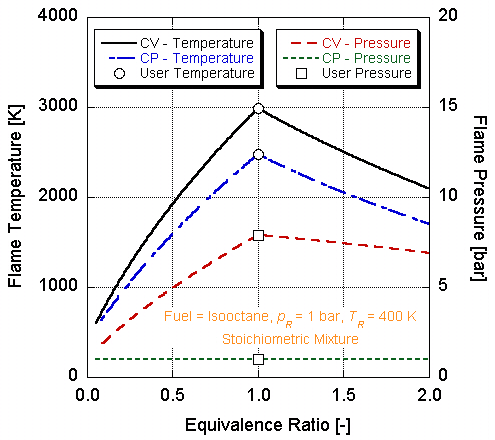
Adiabatic flame temperatures and pressures as a function of ratio of air to iso-octane. A ratio of 1 corresponds to the stoichiometric ratio

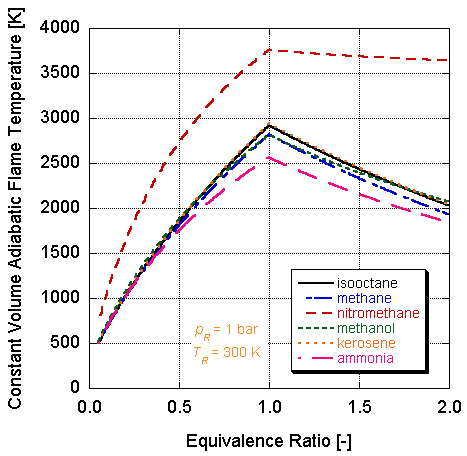
Constant volume flame temperature of a number of fuels, with air

If we make the assumption that combustion goes to completion (i.e. forming only CO_{2} and H_{2}O), we can calculate the adiabatic flame temperature by hand either at stoichiometric conditions or lean of stoichiometry (excess air). This is because there are enough variables and molar equations to balance the left and right hand sides,

$${\rm{C}}_\alpha  {\rm{H}}_\beta  {\rm{O}}_\gamma  {\rm{N}}_\delta   + \left( {a{\rm{O}}_{\rm{2}}  + b{\rm{N}}_{\rm{2}} } \right) \to \nu _1 {\rm{CO}}_{\rm{2}}  + \nu _2 {\rm{H}}_{\rm{2}} {\rm{O}} + \nu _3 {\rm{N}}_{\rm{2}}  + \nu _4 {\rm{O}}_{\rm{2}}$$

Rich of stoichiometry there are not enough variables because combustion cannot go to completion with at least CO and H_{2} needed for the molar balance (these are the most common products of incomplete combustion),

$${\rm{C}}_\alpha  {\rm{H}}_\beta  {\rm{O}}_\gamma  {\rm{N}}_\delta   + \left( {a{\rm{O}}_{\rm{2}}  + b{\rm{N}}_{\rm{2}} } \right) \to \nu _1 {\rm{CO}}_{\rm{2}}  + \nu _2 {\rm{H}}_{\rm{2}} {\rm{O}} + \nu _3 {\rm{N}}_{\rm{2}}  + \nu _5 {\rm{CO}} + \nu _6 {\rm{H}}_{\rm{2}}$$

However, if we include the water gas shift reaction,

$${\rm{CO}}_{\rm{2}}  + H_2  \Leftrightarrow {\rm{CO}} + {\rm{H}}_{\rm{2}} {\rm{O}}$$

and use the equilibrium constant for this reaction, we will have enough variables to complete the calculation.

Different fuels with different levels of energy and molar constituents will have different adiabatic flame temperatures.

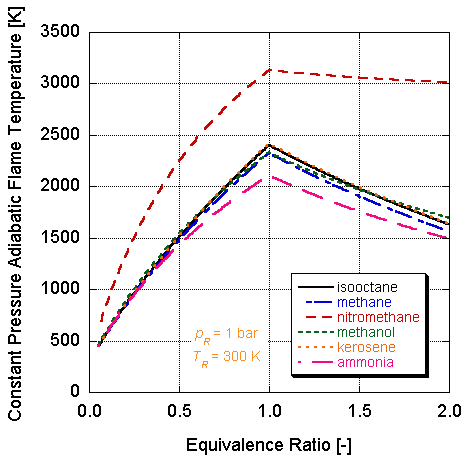
Constant pressure flame temperature of a number of fuels, with air

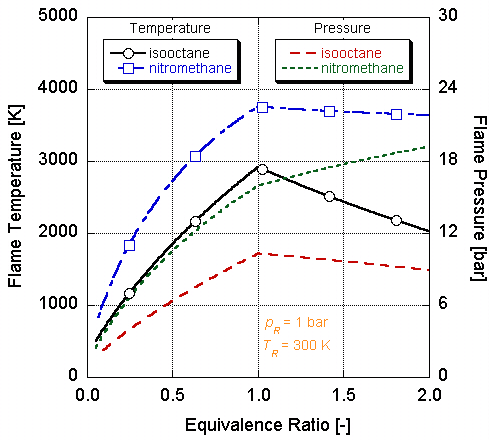
Nitromethane versus isooctane flame temperature and pressure

We can see by the following figure why nitromethane (CH_{3}NO_{2}) is often used as a power boost for cars. Since each molecule of nitromethane contains an oxidant with relatively high-energy bonds between nitrogen and oxygen, it can burn much hotter than hydrocarbons or oxygen-containing methanol. This is analogous to adding pure oxygen, which also raises the adiabatic flame temperature. This in turn allows it to build up more pressure during a constant volume process. The higher the pressure, the more force upon the piston creating more work and more power in the engine. It stays relatively hot rich of stoichiometry because it contains its own oxidant. However, continual running of an engine on nitromethane will eventually melt the piston and/or cylinder because of this higher temperature.

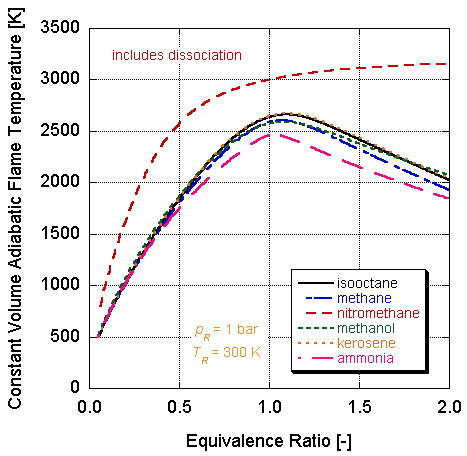
Effects of dissociation on adiabatic flame temperature

In real world applications, complete combustion does not typically occur. Chemistry dictates that dissociation and kinetics will change the composition of the products. There are a number of programs available that can calculate the adiabatic flame temperature taking into account dissociation through equilibrium constants (Stanjan, NASA CEA, AFTP). The following figure illustrates that the effects of dissociation tend to lower the adiabatic flame temperature. This result can be explained through Le Chatelier's principle.

== See also ==
- Flame speed
