= Lewis number =

Ratio of thermal diffusivity to mass diffusivity

In fluid dynamics and thermodynamics, the Lewis number (denoted Le) is a dimensionless number defined as the ratio of thermal diffusivity to mass diffusivity. It is used to characterize fluid flows where there is simultaneous heat and mass transfer. The Lewis number puts the thickness of the thermal boundary layer in relation to the concentration boundary layer. The Lewis number is defined as

$$\mathrm{Le} = \frac{\alpha}{D} = \frac{\lambda}{\rho D_{im} c_p}$$.

where:

- α is the thermal diffusivity,
- D is the mass diffusivity,
- λ is the thermal conductivity,
- ρ is the density,
- D_{im} is the mixture-averaged diffusion coefficient,
- c_{p} is the specific heat capacity at constant pressure.

In the field of fluid mechanics, many sources define the Lewis number to be the inverse of the above definition.

The Lewis number can also be expressed in terms of the Prandtl number (Pr) and the Schmidt number (Sc):

$$\mathrm{Le} = \frac{\mathrm{Sc}}{\mathrm{Pr}}$$

It is named after Warren K. Lewis (1882–1975), who was the first head of the Chemical Engineering Department at MIT. Some workers in the field of combustion assume (incorrectly) that the Lewis number was named for Bernard Lewis (1899–1993), who for many years was a major figure in the field of combustion research.

== Relevance in biology ==
The Lewis number is large for oxygen in water $(\mathrm{Le} \approx 90 \gg 1)$, and this is likely the reason why mammals do not have gills. In gills, oxygen is extracted from seawater into the mammal. Since the Lewis number for water is high, this means that during this diffusion process, a relatively large amount of heat would also be extracted from the animal, as heat diffuses faster than oxygen. This would cause the animal to cool down too much while breathing.
