= Guy Joulin =

French scientist

- Born: June 1950
- Died: 15 December 2024 (aged 74); Poitiers, France
- Education: University of Poitiers
- Known for: Matalon–Matkowsky–Clavin–Joulin theory Diffusive–thermal instability Joulin–Sivashinsky equation Dold–Joulin equation Joulin–Cambray equation Deshaies–Joulin theory Flame ball
- Scientific career
- Fields: Combustion; Physics
- Workplaces: Aix-Marseille University
- Thesis: Existence, stabilité et structuration des flammes prémélangées (1979)
- Doctoral advisor: Paul Clavin

Guy Joulin was a French scientist at Aix-Marseille University who works in the field of combustion.

== Biography ==
Guy Joulin obtained his PhD degree from University of Poitiers in 1979 under the supervision of Paul Clavin.

Joulin was the recipient of the CNRS Silver Medal (1996).

== See also ==
- Norbert Peters
- Forman A. Williams
- Moshe Matalon
- John D. Buckmaster
- Amable Liñán
- Gregory Sivashinsky
- John W. Dold
