= John W. Dold =

College teacher

- Education: Christian Brothers College; University of Zimbabwe; University of London; Cranfield University
- Known for: Kerr–Dold vortex Zeldovich–Liñán–Dold model Dold–Joulin equation Edge flame
- Scientific career
- Workplaces: University of Bristol; University of Provence; University of Manchester
- Thesis: On the auto-ignition and combustion of a finite region of gaseous fuel (1979)
- Academic advisors: John F. Clarke

John William Dold (also known as Bill Dold) is an emeritus professor in the department of mathematics in the University of Manchester, a specialist in the field of Fluid Mechanics and Combustion. He was the founder of the journal Combustion Theory and Modelling.

== Biography and research ==
John attended school at the Christian Brothers College, Bulawayo in Zimbabwe. He completed his bachelors (1971–1974) at the University of Zimbabwe and his doctoral degree (1976–1979) at the Cranfield University under the supervision of John Frederick Clarke. He obtained a master's degree (1971–1974) in area studies at the University of London.

He then joined the faculty of the mathematics department at the University of Bristol and then joined the faculty of mathematics department at the University of Manchester in 1995. In 1997, he along with Mitchell D. Smooke, founded the journal Combustion Theory and Modelling. He also worked at Greater Manchester Fire and Rescue Service from 2010 to 2013. He served as the vice president of SIAM United Kingdom and Republic of Ireland Section from 1998 to 1999. He also served as the editor for Combustion Theory and Modelling and SIAM Journal on Applied Mathematics.

John Dold has made significant contributions in theoretical combustion science, particularly in areas related to partially premixed combustion, fire, ignition, detonations and also in the field of fluid mechanics and water waves. Kerr–Dold vortex, an exact solution of Navier–Stokes equations is named after him,

=== Books ===
- Griffiths, David F.; Dold, John W.; Silvester, David J. (2015). Essential Partial Differential Equations: Analytical and Computational Aspects. Springer. ISBN 978-3319225685.

== See also ==
- Moshe Matalon
- Paul Clavin
- John Frederick Clarke
- Amable Liñán
- Forman A. Williams
- Gregory Sivashinsky
- John D. Buckmaster
