= Moshe Matalon (engineer) =

Israeli-American engineer and mathematician (born 1949)

- משה מטלון
- Born: February 25, 1949 (age 77); Kingdom of Egypt
- Education: Tel Aviv University (BS, MS); Cornell University (PhD)
- Known for: Matalon–Matkowsky–Clavin–Joulin theory
- Scientific career
- Fields: Combustion; Fluid dynamics
- Workplaces: New York University Tandon School of Engineering; Northwestern University; University of Illinois at Urbana–Champaign
- Thesis: Diffusion Flames in a Chamber for Large Activation Energy (1977)
- Doctoral advisor: Geoffrey S. S. Ludford

Moshe Matalon (Hebrew: משה מטלון) is an Israeli-American mechanical engineer and applied mathematician, currently the Caterpillar Distinguished Professor at University of Illinois at Urbana–Champaign.

== Biography ==
He finished his bachelor's and master's degree from Tel Aviv University in 1973 and completed his PhD in 1977 from Cornell University, under the supervision of Geoffrey S. S. Ludford. He worked at New York University Tandon School of Engineering from 1978 to 1980 and then at Northwestern University from 1980 to 2006. He finally moved to University of Illinois at Urbana–Champaign in 2007. His research area includes combustion and fluid dynamics.

Matalon was elected Fellow of the American Physical Society (APS) in 1995, Fellow of the Institute of Physics (IOP) in 1999, Fellow of the American Institute of Aeronautics and Astronautics (AIAA) in 2012, and Fellow of the Combustion Institute in 2018. He is an Associate of the UIUC Centre of Advanced Study and recipient of several awards, including the AIAA Pendray Aerospace Literature Award (2010), the AIAA Fluid Dynamics Award (2016), the Numa Manson medal of the Institute for the Dynamics of Explosions and Reaction Systems (2017), and the Ya. B. Zeldovich Gold Medal of the Combustion Institute (2020). Matalon also serves as an Editor-in-Chief of Combustion Theory and Modelling.

== See also ==
- Norbert Peters
- Amable Liñán
- Forman A. Williams
- John Frederick Clarke
- John D. Buckmaster
- Paul Clavin
- Gregory Sivashinsky
- John W. Dold
