= Soloukhin =

Soloukhin (Russian: Солоухин) is a Russian surname. Notable people with the surname include:

- Rem Soloukhin (1930–1988), Soviet scientist
- Vladimir Soloukhin (1924–1997), Russian poet and writer

== See also ==
- Solodukhin
