= Matalon–Matkowsky–Clavin–Joulin theory =

Theory on a long wave hydrodynamic model

The Matalon–Matkowsky–Clavin–Joulin theory or MMCJ theory refers to a longwave hydrodynamic model of a premixed flame with a large-amplitude flame wrinkling, developed independently by Moshe Matalon & Bernard J. Matkowsky and Paul Clavin & Guy Joulin, following the pioneering study by Paul Clavin and Forman A. Williams, Pierre Pelcé and Paul Clavin and by Gregory Sivashinsky. The theory, for the first time, calculated the burning rate of the curved flame that differs from the burning rate of the planar flame due to flame stretch, associated with the flame curvature and the strain imposed on the flame by the flow field. Specifically, the theory unraveled two important results

- The usual Rankine–Hugoniot conditions, applicable across the flame, gets a correction due to the inner structure of the premixed flame.
- The burning-rate of the flame is influenced by the intrinsic curvature (seen by an observer moving with the flame) and tangential straining of the flame due to flow non-uniformities.

== Corrections to the interfacial conditions ==
=== Kinematic condition and the burning rate formula ===
The kinematic condition, i.e., G equation, at the flame interface is given by

$\frac{\partial G}{\partial t} + \mathbf{v}^-\cdot \nabla G = S_T |\nabla G|.$

where $\mathbf{n}=\nabla G/|\nabla G|$ is the unit normal to the flame surface (pointing towards the burnt gas side), $\mathbf{v}$ is the flow velocity field evaluated at the flame surface. According to Matalon–Matkowsky–Clavin–Joulin theory, if $S_L$ and $\delta_L$ are the laminar burning speed and thickness of a planar flame (and $\tau_L=\delta_L/S_L$ be the corresponding flame residence time), then the burning speed $S_T$ for the curved flame with respect to the unburnt gas is given by

$$\begin{align}S_T =S_L + \mathcal{M}_c \delta_L (S_L-\mathbf{v}^-\cdot\mathbf{n}) \nabla \cdot \mathbf{n} - \mathcal{M}_t \delta_L  \nabla_t\cdot \mathbf{v}_t^-\end{align}$$

where $\nabla_t\cdot \mathbf{v}_t$ is the surface divergence of the tangential velocity $\mathbf{v}_t=(\mathbf{I}-\mathbf{n}\otimes\mathbf{n})\mathbf{v}$; with flow being incompressible outside the flame, $\nabla_t\cdot \mathbf{v}_t=-\mathbf{n}\otimes\mathbf{n}:\nabla\mathbf{v}-(\mathbf{v}\cdot\mathbf{n})\nabla\cdot\mathbf{n}$. Moreover, $\mathcal{M}_c$ and $\mathcal{M}_t$ are the two Markstein numbers, associated with the curvature and tangential straining, which are given, according to Clavin–Williams formula by

$$\mathcal{M}_c=\mathcal{M}_t =  \mathcal{J_1} + \frac{\beta(Le_{\mathrm{eff}}-1)}{2} \mathcal{J_2},$$

where

$$\mathcal{J}_1 = \int_0^1 \frac{\lambda}{\theta}[1-\rho(1-\theta)]d\theta, \quad \mathcal{J}_2 = -\int_0^1 \rho \lambda \ln\theta\,d\theta.$$

Here, $\theta=(T-T_u)/(T_{ad}-T_u)\in[0,1]$ is the ratio of non-dimensional temperature, $\rho=\rho(\theta)$ is the density scaled by its unburnt gas value, $\lambda=\lambda(\theta)$ is the ratio of density-thermal conductivity product to its value in the unburnt gas, $\beta$ is the Zel'dovich number and $Le_{\mathrm{eff}}$ || is the effective Lewis number of the deficient reactant (either fuel or oxidizer or a combination of both).

=== Normal mass flux ===
Due to the finite thickness of the flame, the normal mass flux condition acquires a correction. Let $U_f=-(\partial G/\partial t)/{|\nabla G|}$ be the flame-front speed along $-\mathbf{n}$ (towards the unburnt gas) in the laboratory frame. Then the usual Rankine–Hugoniot conditions for normal mass flux across the interface is $\left[\!\left[ \rho (\mathbf{v}\cdot \mathbf{n}-U_f) \right]\!\right]=0$, where $\left[\!\left[ \varphi \right]\!\right]=\varphi |_{G=0^+}-\varphi |_{G=0^-}$. However, we now arrive at

$$\left[\!\left[ \rho (\mathbf{v}\cdot \mathbf{n}-U_f) \right]\!\right]=-\rho^-\mathcal{I}_c(S_L-\mathbf{v}^-\cdot\mathbf{n}) \nabla \cdot \mathbf{n} + \rho^-\mathcal{I}_t   \nabla_t\cdot \mathbf{v}_t^-$$

where

$$\mathcal{I}_c=\mathcal{I}_t=\int_0^1 \frac{\lambda}{\theta}(1-\rho) d\theta.$$

== See also ==
- G equation
- Markstein number
