= Numa Manson =

French scientist (1913–1993)

- Born: 13 October 1913; Ekaterinoslav, Russian Empire (now Dnipro, Ukraine)
- Died: 2 November 1993 (aged 80); Poitiers, France
- Education: University of Paris
- Scientific career
- Fields: Combustion
- Workplaces: University of Poitiers; French Institute of Petroleum
- Thesis: (1946)

Numa Manson (13 October 1913 – 2 November 1993) was a French scientist, working in the field of combustion and detonation. Along with Antoni K. Oppenheim (Berkeley) and Rem I. Soloukhin (Minsk), he founded the International Committee on Gasdynamics of Explosions and Reactive Systems (ICDERS) in 1967. The Numa Manson medal is named after him.

== Biography ==
Numa Manson was born in Ekaterinoslav on October 13, 1913, but along with his family, he emigrated to Germany in 1923 and further to France in 1926. In 1937, he received the French citizenship.

Manson graduated from the University of Paris in 1934 and from the Higher School of Welding in 1935. From 1936 to 1941, he served in the French army and from 1941 to 1945, he worked at the Welding Institute and from 1946 to 1954, he worked at the French Institute of Petroleum. From 1954 onwards, he was a faculty member at the University of Poitiers. He served as the director of CNRS from 1973 to 1982.

== Notable Numa Manson medal recipients ==
Some notable recipients of the Numa Manson medal are;

- Numa Manson (1975)
- Yakov Zeldovich (1977)
- Sol Penner (1979)
- A. K. Oppenheim
- Rem Soloukhin
- James Arthur Nicholls
- Forman A. Williams (1995)
- Moshe Matalon (2017)
