= Williams diagram =

In combustion, Williams diagram refers to a classification diagram of different turbulent combustion regimes in a plane, having turbulent Reynolds number $Re_l$ as the x-axis and turbulent Damköhler number $Da_l$ as the y-axis. The diagram is named after Forman A. Williams (1985). The definition of the two non-dimensionaless numbers are

$$Re_l = \frac{u' l}{\nu}, \quad Da_l = \frac{l/u'}{t_{\mathrm{ch}}}$$

where $u'$ is the rms turbulent velocity flucturation, $l$ is the integral length scale, $\nu$ is the kinematic viscosity and $t_{\mathrm{ch}}$ is the chemical time scale. The Reynolds number $Re_\lambda$ based on the Taylor microscale $\lambda = l/\sqrt{Re_l}$ becomes $Re_\lambda = \sqrt{Re_l}$. The Damköhler number based on the Kolmogorov time scale $t_{\eta}=\sqrt{\nu l/u^{\prime 3}}$ is given by $Da_\eta= Da_l/\sqrt{Re_l}$. The Karlovitz number $Ka=t_{\mathrm{ch}}/t_\eta$ is defined by $Ka =\sqrt{Re_l/Da_l}$.

The Williams diagram is universal in the sense that it is applicable to both premixed and non-premixed combustion. In supersonic combustion and detonations, the diagram becomes three-dimensional due to the addition of the Mach number $Ma=u'/c$ as the z-axis, where $c$ is the sound speed.

== Borghi–Peters diagram ==
In premixed combustion, an alternate diagram, known as the Borghi–Peters diagram, is also used to describe different regimes. This diagram is named after Roland Borghi (1985) and Norbert Peters (1986). The Borghi–Peters diagram uses $l/\delta_L$ as the x-axis and $u'/S_L$ as the y-axis, where $\delta_L$ and $S_L$ are the thickness and speed of the planar, laminar premixed flame. Since $\delta_L Pr = \nu/S_L$, where $Pr$ is the Prandtl number (set $Pr=1$), and $t_{\mathrm{ch}}=\delta_L/S_L$ in premixed flames, we have

$$Re_l  = \frac{u'}{S_L} \frac{l}{\delta_L}, \quad Da_l = \frac{l/\delta_L}{u'/S_L}, \quad \Rightarrow \quad \frac{l}{\delta_L}= \sqrt{Re_l  Da_l}, \quad \frac{u'}{S_L} = \sqrt{\frac{Re_l}{Da_l}}$$

The limitations of the Borghi–Peters diagram are that (1) it cannot be used for non-premixed combustion and (2) it is not suitable for practically relevant cases where both $Re_l$ and $Da_l$ are increased concurrently, such as increasing nozzle radius while maintaining constant nozzle exit velocity.
