= Kuramoto–Sivashinsky equation =

Equation known for chaotic behavior

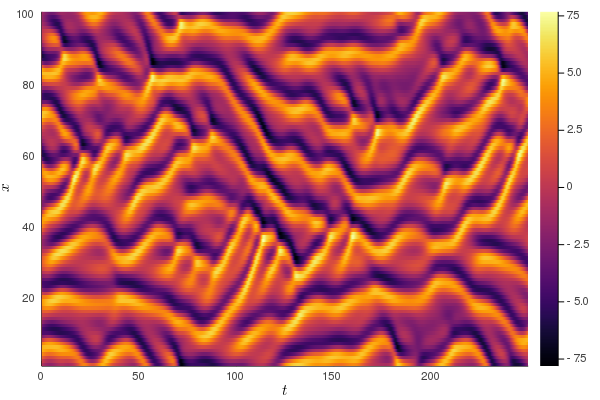
A spatiotemporal plot of a simulation of the Kuramoto–Sivashinsky equation

In mathematics, the Kuramoto–Sivashinsky equation (also called the KS equation) is a partial differential equation used to model complex patterns and chaotic behavior in physical systems. It is one of the simplest PDEs known to exhibit chaos. The fourth-order equation was first derived in the late 1970s by Yoshiki Kuramoto and Gregory Sivashinsky to describe the instabilities of a laminar flame front. It has since been found to apply to other systems, such as the flow of a thin liquid film down an inclined plane and trapped-ion instability in plasmas.

== Definition ==
The 1d version of the Kuramoto–Sivashinsky equation is
$$\partial_t u + \partial_x^2 u + \partial_x^4 u + \tfrac{1}{2} (\partial_x u)^2 = 0$$
An alternate form is
$$\partial_t v + \partial_x^2 v + \partial_x^4 v + v \, \partial_x v = 0$$
obtained by differentiating with respect to $x$ and substituting $v = \partial_x u$. This is the form used in fluid dynamics applications.

The Kuramoto–Sivashinsky equation can also be generalized to higher dimensions. In spatially periodic domains, one possibility is
$$\partial_t u + \Delta u + \Delta^2 u + \tfrac{1}{2} \left|\nabla u\right|^2 = 0,$$
where $\Delta$ is the Laplace operator, and $\Delta^2$ is the biharmonic operator.

== Properties ==
The Cauchy problem for the 1d Kuramoto–Sivashinsky equation is well-posed in the sense of Hadamard—that is, for given initial data $u(x, 0)$, there exists a unique solution $u(x, 0 \leq t < \infty)$ that depends continuously on the initial data.

The 1d Kuramoto–Sivashinsky equation possesses Galilean invariance—that is, if $u(x,t)$ is a solution, then so is $u(x{-}ct, t) - c$, where $c$ is an arbitrary constant. Physically, since $u$ is a velocity, this change of variable describes a transformation into a frame that is moving with constant relative velocity $c$. On a periodic domain, the equation also has a reflection symmetry: if $u(x,t)$ is a solution, then $-u(-x, t)$ is also a solution.

== Solutions ==
A converged relative periodic orbit for the KS equation with periodic boundary conditions for a domain size $L=35$. After some time the system returns to its initial state, only translated slightly (~4 units) to the left. This particular solution has three unstable directions and three marginal directions.

Solutions of the Kuramoto–Sivashinsky equation possess rich dynamical characteristics. Considered on a periodic domain $0 \leq x \leq L$, the dynamics undergoes a series of bifurcations as the domain size $L$ is increased, culminating in the onset of chaotic behavior. Depending on the value of $L$, solutions may include equilibria, relative equilibria, and traveling waves—all of which typically become dynamically unstable as $L$ is increased. In particular, the transition to chaos occurs by a cascade of period-doubling bifurcations.

== Modified Kuramoto–Sivashinsky equation ==
=== Dispersive Kuramoto–Sivashinsky equations ===
A third-order derivative term representing dispersion of wavenumbers are often encountered in many applications. The dispersively modified Kuramoto–Sivashinsky equation, which is often called as the Kawahara equation, is given by

$$\partial_t u + \partial_x^2 u + \delta_3 \partial_x^3 u + \partial_x^4 u + u \, \partial_x u = 0$$

where $\delta_3$ is real parameter. A fifth-order derivative term is also often included, which is the modified Kawahara equation and is given by

$$\partial_t u + \partial_x^2 u + \delta_3 \partial_x^3 u + \partial_x^4 u + \delta_5 \partial_x^5 u + u \, \partial_x u = 0.$$

=== Sixth-order equations ===
Three forms of the sixth-order Kuramoto–Sivashinsky equations are encountered in applications involving tricritical points, which are given by

$$\begin{alignat}{7}
\partial_t u &{}+{}& q \partial_x^2 u &{}+{}& \partial_x^4 u &{}-{}& \partial_x^6 u &{}+{}& u \, \partial_x u &{}={}& 0, &\quad q>0,\\[1ex]
\partial_t u &{}+{}&   \partial_x^2 u &{} {}&                &{}-{}& \partial_x^6 u &{}+{}& u \, \partial_x u &{}={}& 0, \\[1ex]
\partial_t u &{}+{}& q \partial_x^2 u &{}-{}& \partial_x^4 u &{}-{}& \partial_x^6 u &{}+{}& u \, \partial_x u &{}={}& 0, &\quad q>-\tfrac{1}{4}
\end{alignat}$$

in which the last equation is referred to as the Nikolaevsky equation, named after V. N. Nikolaevsky who introduced the equation in 1989, whereas the first two equations has been introduced by P. Rajamanickam and J. Daou in the context of transitions near tricritical points, i.e., change in the sign of the fourth derivative term with the plus sign approaching a Kuramoto–Sivashinsky type and the minus sign approaching a Ginzburg–Landau type.

== Applications ==
Applications of the Kuramoto–Sivashinsky equation extend beyond its original context of flame propagation and reaction–diffusion systems. These additional applications include flows in pipes and at interfaces, plasmas, chemical reaction dynamics, and models of ion-sputtered surfaces.

== See also ==
- Michelson–Sivashinsky equation
- List of nonlinear partial differential equations
- List of chaotic maps
- Clarke's equation
- Laminar flame speed
- G-equation
