= Michelson–Sivashinsky equation =

Partial differential equation

In combustion, the Michelson–Sivashinsky equation describes the evolution of a premixed flame front, subjected to the Darrieus–Landau instability, in the small heat release approximation. The equation was derived by Gregory Sivashinsky in 1977, who, along with Daniel M. Michelson, presented numerical solutions of the equation in the same year. The evolution of deviations from planarity is described by an amplitude function $u(x,t)$. The 1D Michelson–Sivashinsky equation reads:

$$u_t+ \frac{1}{2}u_x^2 = \nu u_{xx} + \mathcal H(u_x),$$

where $\mathcal{H}$ is the Hilbert transform. This is essentially the Burgers' equation with an additional non-local integral term. The Michelson–Sivashinsky equation represents the Darrieus–Landau instability, dictated by the dispersion relation, close to the instability onset,

$$\sigma = |k|- \nu k^2.$$

For the variable $v=u_x$, the equation is given by

$$v_t+ vv_x = \nu v_{xx} + \mathcal H(v_x),$$

== N-pole solution ==
The equations, in the absence of gravity, admits an explicit solution, which is called as the N-pole solution since the equation admits a pole decomposition, as shown by Olivier Thual, Uriel Frisch and Michel Hénon in 1988. Consider the 1d equation

$$v_t+ vv_x = \nu v_{xx} + \mathcal H(v_x).$$

This has a solution of the form

$$\begin{align}v(x,t) &= -2\nu \sum_{n=1}^{2N} \frac{1}{x-z_n(t)}, \\
\frac{dz_n}{dt} &= -2\nu \sum_{l=1,l\neq n}^{2N} \frac{1}{z_n-z_l} - i \mathrm{sgn}(\mathrm{Im} z_n),
\end{align}$$

where $z_n(t)$ (which appear in complex conjugate pairs) are poles in the complex plane. In the case periodic solution with periodicity $2\pi$, the it is sufficient to consider poles whose real parts lie between the interval $0$ and $2\pi$. In this case, we have

$$\begin{align}
v(x,t) &= -\nu \sum_{n=1}^{2\pi} \cot\frac{x-z_n(t)}{2} , \\
\frac{dz_n}{dt} &= -\nu \sum_{l\neq n} \cot\frac{z_n-z_l}{2} - i \mathrm{sgn}(\mathrm{Im} z_n)
\end{align}$$

These poles are interesting because in physical space, they correspond to locations of the cusps forming in the flame front.

== Dold–Joulin equation ==
In 1995, John W. Dold and Guy Joulin generalised the Michelson–Sivashinsky equation by introducing the second-order time derivative, which is consistent with the quadratic nature of the dispersion relation for the Darrieus–Landau instability. The Dold–Joulin equation is given by

$$u_{tt} + \mathcal H\left(u_t- \frac{1}{2}u_x^2 - \nu u_{xx} - \mathcal H(u_x)\right) =0.$$

== Joulin–Cambray equation ==
In 1992, Guy Joulin and Pierre Cambray extended the Michelson–Sivashinsky equation to include higher-order correction terms, following by an earlier incorrect attempt to derive such an equation by Gregory Sivashinsky and Paul Clavin. The Joulin–Cambray equation, in dimensional form, reads as

$$u_t + \frac{S_L}{2}\left(1+\frac{\epsilon}{2}\right)u_x^2 -\epsilon\frac{S_L}{4} \langle u_x^2 \rangle = \frac{S_L \epsilon}{2}\left(1+\frac{\epsilon}{2}\right)\left[\nu \nabla^2\phi + \mathcal H(u_x)\right],$$

$\langle u \rangle(t)$ denotes the spatial average of $u$, which is a time-dependent function.

== Rakib–Sivashinsky equation ==
Incorporating the Rayleigh–Taylor instability of the flame, one obtains the Rakib–Sivashinsky equation (named after Z. Rakib and Gregory Sivashinsky),

$$u_t+ \frac{1}{2}u_x^2 = \nu u_{xx} + \mathcal H(u_x) - \gamma  \left(u - \langle
u \rangle \right)=0, \quad$$

where $\gamma$ is another constant, related to gravity.

== See also ==
- Kuramoto–Sivashinsky equation
