= Paul Clavin =

French scientist

- Born: 19 October 1942 (age 83); Narbonne, France
- Education: University of Poitiers
- Known for: Matalon–Matkowsky–Clavin–Joulin theory Clavin–Williams formula Clavin–Garcia equation Diffusive–thermal instability Clavin–Liñán model
- Scientific career
- Fields: Combustion; Physics
- Workplaces: Aix-Marseille University
- Thesis: Les Equations cinétiques généralisées dans les systèmes inhomogènes; problèmes de la propagation du chaos moléculaire (1971)
- Doctoral advisor: Ilya Prigogine
- Doctoral students: Guy Joulin

Paul Clavin is a French scientist at Aix-Marseille University, working in the field of combustion and statistical mechanics. He is the founder of Institute for Research on Nonequilibrium Phenomena (IRPHE).

== Biography ==
Paul Clavin obtained his first degree at ENSMA and then a Master's degree in Mathematics and Plasma Physics. For his PhD, he joined Ilya Prigogine in Brussels from 1967 to 1970 and then returned to Poitiers. Paul Clavin moved to Aix-Marseille University in the late 1970s and created the combustion research group.

Clavin served as the chair of the Physical Mechanics at Institut Universitaire de France from 1993 to 2004 and the administrator from 2000 to 2005. He received Ya.B. Zeldovich Gold Medal from The Combustion Institute in 2014 and a fellow of The Combustion Institute. A workshop titled Out-of-Equilibrium Dynamics was conducted in 2012 in honor of Clavin's 70th birthday. He is the recipient of Grand Prix award from French Academy of Sciences in 1998 and received Plumey award from Société Française de Physique in 1988. He was elected membre correspondent at the French Academy of sciences in 1997.

=== Books ===
- Paul Clavin, Geoff Searby (2016). Combustion Waves and Fronts in Flows: Flames, Shocks, Detonations, Ablation Fronts and Explosion of Stars. Cambridge University Press. ISBN 978-1107098688.

== See also ==
- Norbert Peters
- Forman A. Williams
- Moshe Matalon
- John D. Buckmaster
- Amable Liñán
- Gregory Sivashinsky
- John W. Dold
