= Catherine Foster (soprano) =

British opera singer

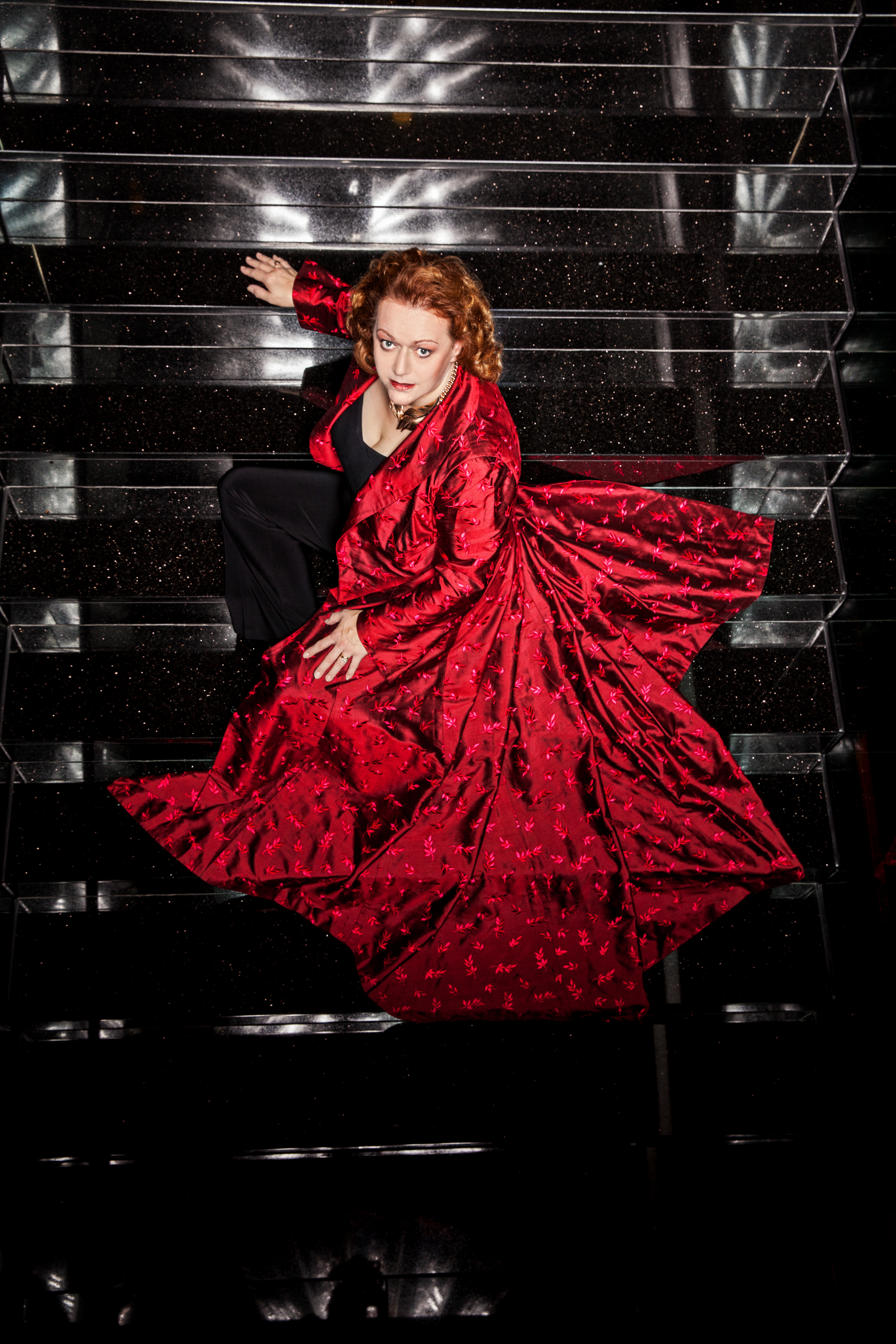
- Born: Nottingham, England
- Education: Birmingham Conservatoire; Royal Northern College of Music; National Opera Studio
- Occupation: Operatic soprano
- Organizations: Nationaltheater Weimar; Bayreuth Festival
- Awards: Dame Eva Turner Awards
- Website: www.catherinefostersoprano.com

Catherine Foster (born 1975) is an English operatic soprano, who has appeared internationally, mostly in European opera houses. Her repertoire has focused on dramatic soprano roles in stage works by Richard Strauss and Richard Wagner, such as the title role of Elektra, and Brünnhilde in Der Ring des Nibelungen, a role which she performed at the Bayreuth Festival in 2013 for Wagner's bicentenary.

== Career ==
Born in Nottingham, Foster played several musical instruments as a girl, and was a lead chorister in the choir of the village church from age 15. She worked first as a nurse and midwife for 15 years. Beginning in 1993 she studied voice with Pamela Cook, who trained her until her death in 2013. Foster studied at the Birmingham Conservatoire from 1995. As a recipient of the Dame Eva Turner Awards, she studied on a scholarship at the Royal Northern College of Music and completed her studies at the National Opera Studio in London in 1999. During her studies, she performed as the Queen of the Night in Mozart's The Magic Flute at the Opera of Northern Ireland in 1998 and the Welsh National Opera. She repeated the role when she sang at the English National Opera for the first time in 2000.

She became a member of the Nationaltheater Weimar in 2001, where she first performed roles such as Mimi in Puccini's La Bohème, Elisabeth in Wagner's Tannhäuser, Leonore in both Beethoven's Fidelio and Verdi's Il trovatore, Senta in Wagner's Der Fliegende Holländer, Abigaille in Verdi's Nabucco and Elektra in Mozart's Idomeneo.

She changed to the dramatic repertory, appearing in title roles of Elektra by Richard Strauss, Wagner's Tristan und Isolde and Puccini's Turandot. In 2007, she performed the role of Brünnhilde in Wagner's Der Ring des Nibelungen in three parts of the cycle. The production was recorded on DVD and made her known. From 2011, she has worked as a freelance singer.

She made her debut at the Bayreuth Festival in 2013 as Brünnhilde in the Ring production staged by Frank Castorf, on the occasion of the bicentenary of Wagner's birth. She performed the role also in the following years, conducted by Kirill Petrenko, Marek Janowski and Plácido Domingo. The production was recorded and broadcast internationally in 2016. She said in an interview that she never received acting training, but "I worked for almost 15 years in a hospital and had many experiences with young and old people, with children, rich and poor, happy and sad people. This is the experience I bring to the stage."

She appeared as Brünnhilde also at the Staatstheater Wiesbaden, in 2017 as part of the Internationale Maifestspiele. A critic wrote after a performance of Götterdämmerung: "Phrasing, understanding and pronunciation of the text, secure intonation and scenic presence are on an unusually high level! This evening, Ms. Foster succeeded in everything! Her voice was perfectly controlled in all registers up to 'C'" ("Phrasierung, Texterfassung und -Verständlichkeit, Intonationssicherheit, szenische Präsenz sind auf auf einem außerordentlich hohen Niveau! An diesem Abend gelang Frau Foster alles! Die Stimme blieb in allen Lagen perfekt kontrolliert bis rauf zum 'C'").

In concert, she sang in Mahler's Eighth Symphony at the Wiener Musikverein, in his Fourth Symphony in the UK. She performed Wagner's Wesendonck Lieder in the US.

In August 2022 she sang the role of Isolde in the Bayreuth production of Tristan und Isolde conducted by Markus Poschner and her performance was well received both by the audience and by the critics.

== Recordings ==
- 2000: The Martyr of Antioch, by Arthur Sullivan, Symposium Record for the Buxton Festival
- 2008: Die Walküre, live from Weimar
- 2008: Siegfried, live from Weimar
- 2008: Götterdämmerung, live from Weimar
- 2009: Siegfried, live from Hamburg
