= Béla Karlovitz =

Hungarian-American engineer, inventor

- Born: 9 November 1904; Pápa, Austria-Hungary
- Died: 29 February 2004 (aged 99); Pittsburgh, Pennsylvania, US
- Citizenship: Hungary; United States
- Education: Budapest University of Technology and Economics; ETH Zurich
- Known for: Karlovitz number
- Scientific career
- Fields: Thermodynamics, Combustion

Béla Karlovitz (November 9, 1904 – February 29, 2004) was a Hungarian engineer who pioneered research into the generation of electricity directly from a body of hot moving gas without any mechanical moving parts. This process is known as magnetohydrodynamic generation or MHD generation for short.

He received his M.E. degree from Technical University, Budapest, Hungary and his E.E. degree from the Federal Institute of Technology, Zurich, Switzerland. Besides his publications in MHD, he is the author of many publications on turbulent flames and combustion instabilities. He was the head of the Flame Research Section, Explosives and Physical Science Division, Bureau of Mines, Pittsburgh, PA. Subsequently, he was with Combustion and Explosive Research, Inc. in Pittsburgh, PA. In combustion, Karlovitz is known as the first to introduce the concept of flame stretch. The Karlovitz number is named after him. It is a non-dimensional quantity defined as: $\mathit{Ka} = k t_c$ where $t_c$ is the characteristic flow time (s) and $k$ is the flame stretch rate (1/s): $k = (dA/dt)/A$; where $A$ is the unit area of the flame and consists of the points that stay on the flame surface.

== Life ==
Karlovitz was born on 9 November 1904 in Pápa, Hungary, into a Catholic family. His father, Adolf Karlovitz, was a pharmacist, and his mother, Ilona Hanauer, was the daughter of the local ironmonger. Béla was the youngest of the three siblings. He has finished the local Catholic secondary school in 1922, which was in the neighborhood of his father's pharmacy.

He graduated in 1926 from the Faculty of Mechanical Engineering at the Technical University of Budapest. There was no electric engineering education in Hungary at this time, therefore he subsequently continued his studies at the ETH Zurich. Béla Karlovitz got married in Switzerland to Maria von König. After returning home, he started working at the Budapest Electric Works. Béla Karlovitz and his coworker Dénes Halász developed a method that was based on the principle of magnetohydrodynamic generation and which was expected to give 50% higher efficiency compared to the contemporary electricity generation methods using heat engines. Béla Karlovitz was unable to exploit his invention in Hungary due to the lack of funding. The Mayor of Budapest recognized the revolutionary potential of MHD generation and guaranteed Béla Karlovitz a fully-paid leave for one year to elaborate the concept. In 1938, Béla Karlovitz from Hungary approached the German Siemens company with a request to develop an MHD generator using combustion gases. Siemens referred him to Westinghouse in the USA. He arrived at the Westinghouse research facility in Pittsburgh, Pennsylvania with colleague Dénes Halász in 1938, and the company provided them US$500,000 to realize their concept. His family intended to follow him in the subsequent year, but World War II broke out, and they could unite only in 1946. Even though they planned to return to Hungary shortly, the political situation in Hungary and his career development both inclined them to stay in the US.

His work there resulted in the world's first patent for the MHD power process on August 13, 1940 (U.S. Patent No. 2,210,918, "Process for the Conversion of Energy"). He worked at Westinghouse until 1947. Later, he mainly dealt with combustion science research at the Explosives and Physical Science Division, Bureau of Mines in Pittsburgh. From 1953, he was working with the Combustion and Explosive Research, Inc.

His name appears on two, less-cited patents from his later career stage. With his colleague, Bernard Lewis, they have worked on the improvement of aluminum production for increased efficiency and process safety He also worked for Toyota to reduce the pollutant emission of their spark-ignition engine.

Béla Karlovitz pursued a scientific career even after his retirement, up to his death at 99 on the leap day of 2004. His last scientific paper was published in 2000.

== History of MHD generation and MHD propulsion ==
Development and research on MHD generation, which was interrupted by World War II, continued in the 1960s. The first dedicated conference on MHD generation was held in the UK in 1962, which was followed by two others biannually. MHD research went out of fashion in the 1960s due to the emergence of nuclear technology for power generation. In the 1970s, the research was continued since this technology seemed to offer superior efficiency for conventional coal-fired thermal power plants. However, its use in electricity generation was inferior to the combined cycle power plants, which appeared in the 80s. Nevertheless, several countries had research groups continuously working on this concept. A Yugoslavian team succeeded first to build a working plant in 1989, followed by two other plants in the US and Russia.

The potential of MHD propulsion was realized by the navy in the 60s. However, the first practical working propulsion device was not built until 1992, which was the Yamato 1 ship by the Mitsubishi Heavy Industries. In the 1990s, Mitsubishi built several further prototype ships propelled by MHD systems, but their maximum speed was only 8 kn (15 km/h), therefore the development of this technology was abandoned.

The world fame of MHD generation is related to The Hunt for Red October (film), in which the Soviet Union develops a submarine, using MHD drives, providing the vessel stealth capabilities. The film was an adaptation from the debut novel by Tom Clancy. Even though it was a fiction, the technology behind it was made real within a few years.

Nevertheless, the principles of MHD are utilized today by magnetic flow meters. These devices are precise, reliable, however, limited to conducting liquids.
