= KSE =

KSE may mean:

- Karachi Stock Exchange, now Pakistan Stock Exchange
- Kuwait Stock Exchange
- Korea Stock Exchange
- Kyiv School of Economics
- Kroenke Sports & Entertainment
- Killswitch Engage, an American heavy metal band
- Kuramoto–Sivashinsky equation, a partial differential equation
