= John Buckmaster =

John Buckmaster may refer to:

- John C. Buckmaster (1914–1995), English actor, father of Paul Buckmaster
- John D. Buckmaster (born 1941), American engineer and physicist
- John R. Buckmaster (1915–1983), English actor
