= Bernard J. Matkowsky =

American mathematician (1939–2020)

- Born: August 19, 1939
- Died: June 11, 2020 (aged 80)
- Education: City College of New York; New York University
- Known for: Matalon–Matkowsky–Clavin–Joulin theory
- Scientific career
- Workplaces: Rensselaer Polytechnic Institute; Northwestern University
- Thesis: Asymptotic solution of partial differential equations in thin domains (1966)
- Doctoral advisor: Joseph Keller

Bernard Judah Matkowsky (19 August 1939 – 11 June 2020) was an American applied mathematician.

Matkowsky received a B.S. from City College of New York in 1960, an M.E.E. from New York University (NYU) in 1961, an M.S. in 1963 and a Ph.D. in 1966 from the Courant Institute at NYU. His advisor was Joseph B. Keller and his thesis was entitled "Asymptotic Solution of Partial Differential Equations in Thin Domains". He was Professor of Mathematics at Rensselaer Polytechnic Institute from 1966 to 1977. In 1977 he accepted an offer from Northwestern University, with a mandate to build an Applied Mathematics department, eventually becoming Professor of Applied Mathematics, Mathematics and Mechanical Engineering. In 1990 he was appointed John Evans Professor of Applied Mathematics. He was chair of the Applied Math department from 1993 to 1999.

He was Visiting Professor at Tel Aviv University in 1972–73, at the Weizmann Institute in 1976 and 1980 and at the Technion in 2007. He was a consultant at Argonne National Laboratory, at Sandia Livermore National Laboratory, at Lawrence Livermore National Laboratory and at Exxon Research and Engineering. He was a Fulbright-Hays Fellow in 1972–73, a Guggenheim Fellow in 1982–83, was awarded two medals by the Russian Academy of Sciences, one for "important contributions to modeling SHS Processes" in 1999, and the Jubilee medal for "contributions to Combustion Theory" in 2007, as well as other honors.

He worked on Asymptotic and Perturbation methods for Ordinary, Partial and Stochastic Differential Equations, Bifurcation, Pattern Formation and Nonlinear Dynamics, with applications in Fluid and Solid Dynamics, Combustion and Flame Theory, Combustion Synthesis of Materials (SHS) and Filtration Combustion in Porous Media; to name but a few.

He was awarded the John von Neumann Lecture Prize in 2017. The title of his lecture was "Singular Perturbations in Noisy Dynamical Systems", published in the European Journal of Applied Mathematics. He was a Fellow of the American Association for the Advancement of Science, the American Physical Society, the American Academy of Mechanics, and the Society of Industrial and Applied Mathematics.

He authored in excess of 250 papers, was an Institute for Scientific Information (ISI) Highly Cited Researcher, and was an editor of eight journals and two book series/monographs.

In 1965 he was married to Florence Knobel and together they had three children and six grandchildren.

== Bibliography (selected) ==
- with A. P. Aldushin: Instabilities, Fingering and the Saffman-Taylor Problem in Filtration Combustion, Comb. Sci. & Tech. 133, (1998), pp. 293–344
- with A. Bayliss, A. Golovin, A. Nepomnyashchy: Coupled KS-CGL and Coupled Burgers-CGL Equations for Flames Governed by a Sequential Reaction, Physica D. 129, (1999), pp. 253–298
- with A. P. Aldushin: Rapid Filtration Combustion Waves Driven by Convection, Combustion Science & Tech. 140, (1999), pp. 259–293.
- with A. P. Aldushin, A. Bayliss: Dynamics in Layer Models of Solid Flame Propagation, Physica D 143 (2000), pp. 109–137
- with A. Golovin, A. Nepomnyashchy: Traveling and Spiral Waves for Sequential Flames with Translation Symmetry: Coupled CGL-Burgers Equations, Physica D 160 (2001) pp. 1–28
- with A.P. Aldushin, K.G. Shkadinsky, G.V. Shkadinskaya, V.A. Volpert: Mathematical Modeling of SHS Processes, Kapitel 7 in: Comb. Sci. and Tech. vol 5: Self-Propagating High-Temperature Synthesis of Materials., Eds. A. Borisov, L. DeLuca, A.G. Merzhanov, Taylor and Francis 2002
- with A. Bayliss: A World of SHS Wave Modes, Kapitel 8 in: Comb. Sci. and Tech. vol 5: Self-Propagating High-Temperature Synthesis of Materials., Eds. A. Borisov, L. DeLuca, A.G. Merzhanov, Taylor and Francis 2002
- with A. Bayliss, A. P. Aldushin: Dynamics of Hot Spots in Solid Fuel Combustion, Physica D 166 (2002) pp. 104–130
- with A. Golovin, A. Nepomnyashchy: A Complex Swift-Hohenberg Equation Coupled to the Goldstone Mode in the Nonlinear Dynamics of Flames, Physica D 179 (2003) pp. 183–210
- with C. W. Wahle, A. P. Aldushin: Effects of Gas-Solid Nonequilibrium in Filtration Combustion, Combustion Science & Tech. 175 (2003) pp. 1389–1499
- with A.G. Class, A.Y. Klimenko: A Unified Model of Flames as Gasdynamic Discontinuities, J. Fluid Mech. 491 (2003) pp. 11–49
- with A.G. Class, A.Y. Klimenko: Stability of Planar Flames as Gasdynamic Discontinuities, J. Fluid Mech. 491 (2003) pp. 51–63
- with A. P. Aldushin, A. Bayliss: On the Transition from Smoldering to Flaming, Combustion & Flame, 145, (2006) pp. 579–606
