= Geoffrey S. S. Ludford =

American scientist (1921–2021)

- Born: Geoffrey S. S. Ludford; February 2, 1928; London, United Kingdom
- Died: December 11, 1986 (aged 58); Ithaca, New York, United States of America
- Education: University of Cambridge; Harvard University
- Scientific career
- Fields: Fluid dynamics Combustion; Magnetohydrodynamics
- Workplaces: University of Maryland; Cornell University
- Thesis: Three topics in the mathematical theory of compressible flows (1951)
- Doctoral advisor: Richard von Mises
- Doctoral students: John D. Buckmaster; Moshe Matalon; Pamela Cook

Geoffrey Stuart Stephen Ludford (February 2, 1928 – December 11, 1986) was an applied mathematician who worked in the field of fluid dynamics, combustion and magnetohydrodynamics.

== Biography ==
Geoffrey S. S. Ludford grew up in London. He earned his bachelors degree at the University of Cambridge at the age of 20 in 1948. He started his graduate studies at Cambridge with Leslie Howarth, however moved to Harvard University to work under the supervision of Richard von Mises. He obtained his doctoral degree in 1951 at the age of 23 under the supervision of von Mises, although all his degree were still conferred from the University of Cambridge. After this, he joined the faculty of University of Maryland. In 1961, he moved to Cornell University.

== Books ==
Geoffrey S. S. Ludford completed Richard von Mises book on compressible flow following the death of the latter, along with the help of Hilda Geiringer, a mathematician and the wife of Richard von Mises. His published books are

- Richard von Mises, Hilda Geiringer, G. S. S. Ludford (1958). Mathematical theory of compressible fluid flow. Academic press. ISBN 978-0486439419.
- John D. Buckmaster, G. S. S. Ludford (1982). Theory of laminar flames. Cambridge University Press. ISBN 978-0521091923.
- John D. Buckmaster, G. S. S. Ludford (1983). Lectures on mathematical combustion. SIAM. ISBN 978-0898711868.
- G. S. S. Ludford (Eds) (1986). Reacting flows: Combustion and chemical reactors Part 1. American Mathematical Society. ISBN 978-0821811276.
- G. S. S. Ludford (Eds) (1986). Reacting flows: Combustion and chemical reactors Part 2. American Mathematical Society. ISBN 978-0821811283.

== Awards and honours ==
The NATO advanced research workshop titled Colloque sur la Modélisation Mathématique en Combustion et ses Applications, was conducted in 1986 in Lyon in honor of Geoffrey S. S. Ludford. The workshop contributions are published in a book by Springer in 1988. Some of Geoffrey's awards include

- Guggenheim Fellowship (1957) from John Simon Guggenheim Memorial Foundation
- Alexander von Humboldt U.S. Senior Scientist Award
- Fellow of the Cambridge Philosophical Society
