= Markstein number =

Dimensionless parameter in combustion

In combustion engineering and explosion studies, the Markstein number or Michelson–Markstein number (named after Vladimir Alexandrovich Michelson and George H. Markstein, who proposed the concept in 1889 and 1951, respectively) characterizes the effect of local heat release of a propagating flame on variations in the surface topology along the flame, associated with local flame front curvature and flow straining of the flame. There are two dimensionless Markstein numbers: one is the curvature Markstein number and the other is the tangential flow-strain Markstein number. They are defined as:

$$\mathcal{M}_c = \frac{\mathcal{L}_c}{\delta_L}, \quad \mathcal{M}_t = \frac{\mathcal{L}_t}{\delta_L}$$

where $\mathcal{L}_c$ is the curvature Markstein length (curvature seen by a local observer moving with the flame), $\mathcal{L}_t$ is the tangential flow-strain Markstein length and $\delta_L$ is the characteristic laminar flame thickness. For real flames, $\mathcal{M}_c\neq \mathcal{M}_t$, although asymptotic studies based on a one-step chemistry model predict it to be otherwise.

If $S_L$ is the burning speed of a unstrained, planar premixed flame with respect to the unburnt gas, then the local burning speed $S_T$ of a strained or curved (or a combination of both) premixed flame is given by

$$\begin{align}S_T =S_L + \mathcal{M}_c \delta_L (S_L-\mathbf{v}^-\cdot\mathbf{n}) \nabla \cdot \mathbf{n} - \mathcal{M}_t \delta_L  \nabla_t\cdot \mathbf{v}_t^-\end{align}$$

where $\mathbf{n}$ is the local unit normal (pointing to the burnt gas) of the flame front, $\mathbf{v}^-$ is the local flow velocity evaluated on the unburnt-side of the flame front; $\nabla_t\cdot \mathbf{v}_t$ is the surface divergence of the tangential velocity $\mathbf{v}_t=(\mathbf{I}-\mathbf{n}\otimes\mathbf{n})\mathbf{v}$; with flow being incompressible outside the flame, $\nabla_t\cdot \mathbf{v}_t=-\mathbf{n}\otimes\mathbf{n}:\nabla\mathbf{v}-(\mathbf{v}\cdot\mathbf{n})\nabla\cdot\mathbf{n}$.

The two canonical configurations pertaining to the two Markstein numbers are as follows. In a spherically symmetric flame (with purely radial flow), we have $\mathbf{v}_t=0$ and as a result

$$S_T =S_L + \mathcal{M}_c \delta_L (S_L-\mathbf{v}^-\cdot\mathbf{n}) \nabla \cdot \mathbf{n}.$$

On the other hand, for a flat flame but subject to tangential straining (say, flames in a stagnation point flow), $\mathbf{n}$ is constant and as a result

$$\begin{align}S_T =S_L - \mathcal{M}_t \delta_L  \nabla_t\cdot \mathbf{v}_t^-.\end{align}$$

== Burnt-gas Markstein numbers ==
In some experimental configurations, the burning rate is measured with respect to the burnt gas. Then, one defines

$$\begin{align}S_T^b =S_L^b + \mathcal{M}_c^b \delta_L (S_L^b-\mathbf{v}^+\cdot\mathbf{n}) \nabla \cdot \mathbf{n} - \mathcal{M}_t^b \delta_L  \nabla_t\cdot \mathbf{v}_t^+\end{align}$$

where $\mathbf{v}^+$ is the flow velocity measured on the burnt-gas side of the flame front. There exists a definite relation between the burnt-gas Markstein numbers $(\mathcal{M}_c^b,\mathcal{M}_t^b)$ and the unburnt-gas Markstein numbers $(\mathcal{M}_c,\mathcal{M}_t)$.

== Clavin–Williams formula ==
The Markstein number with respect to the unburnt gas mixture was derived by Paul Clavin and Forman A. Williams in 1982, using activation energy asymptotics and one-step chemistry model. The formula was extended to include temperature dependences on the thermal conductivities by Paul Clavin and Pedro Luis Garcia Ybarra in 1983. The Clavin–Williams formula is given by

$$\mathcal{M}_c=\mathcal{M}_t =  \mathcal{J_1} + \frac{\beta(Le_{\mathrm{eff}}-1)}{2} \mathcal{J_2},$$

where

$$\mathcal{J}_1 = \int_0^1 \frac{\lambda}{\theta}[1-\rho(1-\theta)]d\theta, \quad \mathcal{J}_2 = -\int_0^1 \rho \lambda \ln\theta\,d\theta.$$

Here

$\theta=(T-T_u)/(T_{ad}-T_u)\in[0,1]$	is the ratio of non-dimensional temperature
$\rho=\rho(\theta)$	is the density scaled by its unburnt gas value;
$\lambda=\lambda(\theta)$	is the ratio of density-thermal diffusivity product to its value in the unburnt gas;
$\beta$	is the Zeldovich number;
$Le_{\mathrm{eff}}$	is the effective Lewis number of the deficient reactant (either fuel or oxidizer or a combination of both);

In typical cases, one have

$$\rho=\frac{1}{1+q\theta}, \quad \lambda = (1+q\theta)^n$$

where $n=0.7$ and $q\approx 4-8$ is the heat release parameter; the unburnt-to-burnt gas density ratio $r$ is given by $r=1+q$. Then, we have

$$\mathcal{J}_1 = \frac{1+q}{nq}[(1+q)^n-1], \quad \mathcal{J}_2 = \sum_{k=0}^{\infty}\binom{n-1}{k}\frac{q^k}{(k+1)^2}.$$

Paul Clavin and Jose C. Graña-Otero showed that $\mathcal{M}_c\neq \mathcal{M}_t$ for the two-step Zeldovich–Liñán–Dold model. The Markstein-number formulas, accounting for heat losses and transient pressure variations, were derived by D. Keller and Norbert Peters.

== Markstein numbers under Darcy's law ==
The Markstein-number formulas under Darcy's law were derived by P. Rajamanickam and J. Daou. When a flame propagates through strongly confined environments—such as narrow Hele-Shaw cells or permeable porous media—the flow is governed by Darcy's law. Under Darcy's law, a major qualitative departure from classical flame theory occurs: the curvature Markstein number $\mathcal{M}_c$ and the tangential flow-strain Markstein number $\mathcal{M}_t$ are fundamentally unequal ($\mathcal{M}_c \neq \mathcal{M}_t$) even for the one-step chemistry model. This inequality arises because Darcy's law permits leading-order tangential velocity discontinuities across the flame front due to fluid viscosity variations. Furthermore, a third parameter, the gravity-strain Markstein number $\mathcal{M}_g$, uniquely emerges under this formulation. The three Darcy-law Markstein numbers are given by

$$\mathcal{M}_c = \mathcal{J}_1 + \frac{\beta(Le_{\mathrm{eff}}-1)}{2}\mathcal{J}_2, \quad \mathcal{M}_t = \mathcal{J}_3 + \frac{\beta(Le_{\mathrm{eff}}-1)}{2}\mathcal{J}_4, \quad \mathcal{M}_g = \mathcal{J}_5 - \frac{\beta(Le_{\mathrm{eff}}-1)}{2}\mathcal{J}_6,$$

where

$$\mathcal{J}_1 = \int_0^1 \frac{\lambda}{\theta}[1-\rho(1-\theta)]d\theta, \quad \mathcal{J}_2 = -\int_0^1 \rho \lambda \ln\theta\,d\theta,$$
$$\mathcal{J}_3 = \int_0^1 \frac{\lambda}{\theta}\left[1-\frac{\rho}{\mu}(1-\theta)\right]d\theta, \quad \mathcal{J}_4 = -\int_0^1 \frac{\rho}{\mu} \lambda \ln\theta\,d\theta,$$
$$\mathcal{J}_5 = \int_0^1 \frac{\rho\lambda}{\mu\theta}(1-\rho)(1-\theta)d\theta, \quad \mathcal{J}_6 = -\int_0^1 \frac{\rho\lambda}{\mu} (1-\rho) \ln\theta\,d\theta.$$

Here, $\mu=\mu(\theta)$ is the viscosity (or more precisely viscosity/permeability) scaled by its unburnt gas value. The local burning speed $S_T$ of a strained or curved (or a combination of both) premixed flame is now given by

$$\begin{align}S_T =S_L + \mathcal{M}_c \delta_L (S_L-\mathbf{v}^-\cdot\mathbf{n}) \nabla \cdot \mathbf{n} - \mathcal{M}_t \delta_L  \nabla_t\cdot \mathbf{v}_t^- - \mathcal{M}_g \frac{\delta_L g\kappa_u}{\nu_u}  \nabla_t\cdot \mathbf{e}_{g,t}^-\end{align}$$

where $\kappa_u$ is the medium permeability, $\nu_u$ is the kinetic viscosity of the unburnt gas and $g\mathbf{e}_g$ is the gravity vector.

== See also ==
- G equation
- Matalon–Matkowsky–Clavin–Joulin theory
- Clavin–Garcia equation
