= Yoshiki Kuramoto =

Japanese physicist (born 1940)

Yoshiki Kuramoto (蔵本 由紀, Kuramoto Yoshiki) (born 1940) is a Japanese physicist in the Nonlinear Dynamics group at Kyoto University who formulated the Kuramoto model and is also known for the Kuramoto–Sivashinsky equation. He is also the discoverer of so-called chimera states in networks of coupled oscillators.

Kuramoto specializes in nonlinear dynamics (also known as nonlinear science) and non-equilibrium statistical mechanics. Notably, he has worked on the network dynamics created by limit cycle oscillators. Among his accomplishments is the derivation of the Kuramoto–Sivashinsky equation, which describes the phase instability of oscillating fields. This is regarded as the first example of spatiotemporal chaos. Another achievement is his proposal of a solvable model for oscillator populations, now known as the Kuramoto model. Other achievements include deriving the complex Ginzburg–Landau equation in reaction-diffusion systems and studying the entrainment phenomenon in coupled oscillator systems.

== Biography ==
He was born in Osaka.

He holds a Doctor of Science degree from Kyoto University (1970). He is currently an emeritus professor of Kyoto University and a visiting professor at the Research Institute for Mathematical Sciences, Kyoto University.

Kuramoto was a student of Kazuhisa Tomita and Hajime Mori. Originally, he studied the statistical mechanics of phase transitions, but he began researching nonlinear dynamics due to doubts about the research on dissipative structures by Ilya Prigogine and others, who received the Nobel Prize for their work.

His book "Chemical Oscillations, Waves, and Turbulence" is one of the most cited publications in the field of nonlinear dynamics, and it is often said that "the number of citations exceeds the number of copies published."

== Career ==
1964 - Graduated from the Department of Physics, Faculty of Science, Kyoto University

1969 - Left the Doctoral Course of the Graduate School of Science, Kyoto University, after earning the required credits. Assistant at the Faculty of Science, Kyushu University

April 1976 - Associate Professor, Faculty of Science, Kyoto University

April 1981 - Professor at the Research Institute for Fundamental Physics, Kyoto University

April 1985 - Professor, Faculty of Science, Kyoto University

1995 - Professor, Graduate School of Science, Kyoto University 2004 ** Retired from Kyoto University and became an emeritus Professor of Kyoto University. Specially Appointed Professor, Hokkaido University COE

2005 - Received the Asahi Prize for his pioneering research on nonlinear science, such as synchronization phenomena.

2008 - Visiting professor, Research Institute for Mathematical Sciences, Kyoto University (Itoh Kiyoshi Doctor Gauss Prize Award Memorial (Nomura Group) Mathematical Analysis Contribution Research Division)

2013 - Deputy Director, International Institute for Advanced Studies (until March 2017)

== Major works ==
Chemical Oscillations, Waves, and Turbulence Springer-Verlag, 1984 (Reissued by Dover publications in 2003)

"Iwanami Lectures: The World of Physics, Statistical Mechanics 1: Bridging Micro and Macro—Thoughts on Heat and Statistical Mechanics" (Iwanami Shoten, 2002) "

New Natural Science—The Potential of Nonlinear Science" (Iwanami Shoten, 2003) Chikuma Gakugei Bunko, 2016

"Nonlinear Science" (Shueisha Shinsho, 2007)

"Nonlinear Science: Synchronizing World" Shueisha Shinsho 2014

=== Co-authored works ===
"Pattern Formation" co-authored with Michio Yamada, Shigeru Shinomoto, Kyoji Kawasaki, Shoichi Kai (Asakura Publishing, 1991)

"Iwanami Lectures: Modern Physics Vol.15, Dissipative Structures and Chaos" co-authored with Hajime Mori (Iwanami Shoten, 1994)

Dissipative Structures and Chaos co-authored with Hajime Mori; translated by Glenn C. Paquette. Springer c1998.

"The World of Rhythm Phenomena" Editor (Tokyo University Press, Nonlinear and Non-equilibrium Phenomena of Mathematics, 2005)

"Mathematics of Synchronization Phenomena: Approach by Phase Description" co-authored with Hiroshi Kawamura (Baifukan, Nonlinear Science Series, 2010)
