= Buckmaster equation =

In mathematics, the Buckmaster equation is a second-order nonlinear partial differential equation, named after John D. Buckmaster, who derived the equation in 1977. The equation models the surface of a thin sheet of viscous liquid. The equation was derived earlier by S. H. Smith and by P Smith, but these earlier derivations focused on the steady version of the equation.

The Buckmaster equation is

$$u_t = (u^4)_{xx} + \lambda (u^3)_x$$

where $\lambda$ is a known parameter.
