= Ysgol Ardudwy =

Welsh comprehensive school

Location
- Ffordd y Traeth; Harlech, Gwynedd, LL46 2UH; Wales
- 52.8621°N 4.1115°W

Information
- Type: Comprehensive
- Opened: 1957; 69 years ago
- Local authority: Gwynedd
- Headteacher: Aled Williams
- Gender: Co-educational
- Age: 11 to 16
- Enrolment: 334 (2024)
- Language: Bilingual (Type A)
- Colour: Blue
- Website: ysgolardudwy.cymru (in Welsh and English)

Ysgol Ardudwy is a bilingual secondary school for 11–16 year olds at Harlech, Gwynedd, Wales. It serves the seaside communities of Penrhyndeudraeth, Harlech, Abermaw (Barmouth) and nearby villages. It had 323 pupils on the roll in 2023.

== Leadership ==
The current headteacher is Aled Williams.

The school was formerly led by headmaster Tudur Williams for 28 years until his abrupt resignation a week into a new school year in 2018.

== Welsh language ==
Ysgol Ardudwy is categorised linguistically by the Welsh Government as a category 2A school: at least 80 per cent of subjects apart from English and Welsh are taught only through the medium of Welsh to all pupils. However, one or two subjects are taught to some pupils in English or in both languages.

In December 2018, 34 per cent of pupils came from Welsh-speaking homes, but 89 per cent of the school's pupils were found to speak Welsh fluently.

== Alumni ==
- Mari Strachan (born 1945), novelist and librarian
- Philip Pullman (born 1946), children's novelist
- David Silvester (born 1958), mathematician and author
- Rhodri Jeffreys-Jones (born 1952), emeritus professor of history
