= James Munkres =

American mathematician (1930–2026)

James R. Munkres
- Born: August 18, 1930; Omaha, Nebraska, U.S.
- Died: July 30, 2026 (aged 95); Bedford, Massachusetts, U.S.
- Education: Nebraska Wesleyan University; University of Michigan
- Known for: Topology; Hungarian algorithm
- Scientific career
- Fields: Mathematician
- Workplaces: University of Michigan; Princeton University; Massachusetts Institute of Technology
- Doctoral advisor: Edwin Evariste Moïse
- Doctoral students: Robert Penner

James Raymond Munkres (August 18, 1930 – July 30, 2026) was an American mathematician and academic who was professor of mathematics at MIT and is the author of several texts in the area of topology, including Topology (an undergraduate-level text), Analysis on Manifolds, Elements of Algebraic Topology, and Elementary Differential Topology. He is also the author of Elementary Linear Algebra.

== Life and career ==
Munkres completed his undergraduate education at Nebraska Wesleyan University and received his Ph.D. from the University of Michigan in 1956; his advisor was Edwin E. Moise. Earlier in his career he taught at the University of Michigan and at Princeton University.

Among Munkres' contributions to mathematics is the development of the Hungarian algorithm which is sometimes called Munkres assignment algorithm. A significant contribution in topology is his obstruction theory for the smoothing of homeomorphisms. These developments establish a connection between the John Milnor groups of differentiable structures on spheres and the smoothing methods of classical analysis.

He was elected to the 2018 class of fellows of the American Mathematical Society.

Munkres died on July 30, 2026, at the age of 95.

== Textbooks ==
- Munkres, James R. (2000). Topology (2nd ed.). Upper Saddle River, NJ: Prentice Hall, Inc. ISBN 978-0-13-181629-9. OCLC 42683260. (accessible to patrons with print disabilities)
