= Center for Energy Research =

American research association

The Center for Energy Research (formerly known as Energy Center) is a research association for studying energy research, operated by University of California, San Diego. The center was founded by Sol Penner on July 1, 1974, even though Sol Penner was already operating the research unit from Fall, 1972, who also served as the director till 1990. The major research of the Center includes fusion energy, renewable energy, fuel cells, energy storage etc.

The center has collaborations with various institutions and laboratories such as Los Alamos National Laboratory, Lawrence Livermore National Laboratory, Oak Ridge National Laboratory, Princeton Plasma Physics Laboratory, Sandia National Laboratories, etc.

== Directors ==
The following people have been served as the director of Center for Energy Research:

- 1974–1990: Sol Penner
- 1990–2006: Forman A. Williams
- 2006–2015: Farrokh Najmabadi
- 2015–2019: Farhat N. Beg
- 2019–present: Jan Kleissl
