= Peters four-step chemistry =

Series of reactions for methane combustion

Peters four-step chemistry is a systematically reduced mechanism for methane combustion, named after Norbert Peters, who derived it in 1985. The mechanism reads as

$$\begin{align}
& \text{I)}   && \ce{CH4 + 2H + H2O -> CO + 4H2} \\
& \text{II)}  && \ce{CO + H2O <-> CO2 + H2} \\
& \text{III)} && \ce{H + H + M -> H2 + M} \\
& \text{IV)}  && \ce{O2 + 3H2 <-> 2H + 2H2O}
\end{align}$$

The mechanism predicted four different regimes where each reaction takes place. The third reaction, known as radical consumption layer, where most of the heat is released, and the first reaction, also known as fuel consumption layer, occur in a narrow region at the flame. The fourth reaction is the hydrogen oxidation layer, whose thickness is much larger than the former two layers. Finally, the carbon monoxide oxidation layer is the largest of them all, corresponding to the second reaction, and oxidizes very slowly.

== Peters-Williams three-step chemistry ==
A three-step mechanism was derived in 1987 by Peters and Forman A. Williams by assuming steady-state approximation for the hydrogen radical. Then,

$$\begin{align}
& \text{I)}   && \ce{CH4 + O2 -> CO + H2 + H2O} \\
& \text{II)}  && \ce{CO + H2O <-> CO2 + H2} \\
& \text{III)} && \ce{O2 + 2H2 <-> 2H2O}
\end{align}$$

== See also ==
- Zeldovich–Liñán model
