= Farhat N. Beg =

American physicist

Farhat Nadeem Beg from the University of California, San Diego, was awarded the status of Fellow in the American Physical Society, after he was nominated by his Division of Plasma Physics in 2009, for contributions to the understanding of physics of short pulse high intensity laser matter interactions and pulsed power driven dense Z-pinches. His empirical scaling of hot electron temperature versus laser intensity has contributed significantly to the understanding of relativistic electron generation and transport in matter. He was the recipient of the Department of Energy Early Career Award in 2005 as well as the IEEE Early Achievement Award in 2008. He also has been a fellow of the IEEE since 2011. He currently is the director of the Center for Energy Research at UCSD with a focus on Inertial Confinement Fusion.

== See also ==
- List of fellows of the American Physical Society (1998–2010)
