= Laminar flamelet model =

The laminar flamelet model is a mathematical method for modelling turbulent combustion. The laminar flamelet model is formulated specifically as a model for non-premixed combustion

The concept of ensemble of laminar flamelets was first introduced by Forman A. Williams in 1975, while the theoretical foundation was developed by Norbert Peters in the early 80s.

== Theory ==
The flamelet concept considers the turbulent flame as an aggregate of thin, laminar (Re < 2000), locally one-dimensional flamelet structures present within the turbulent flow field. Counterflow diffusion flame is a common laminar flame which is used to represent a flamelet in a turbulent flow. Its geometry consists of opposed and axi-symmetric fuel and oxidizer jets. As the distance between the jets is decreased and/or the velocity of the jets is increased, the flame is strained and departs from its chemical equilibrium until it eventually extinguishes. The mass fraction of species and temperature fields can be measured or calculated in laminar counterflow diffusion flame experiments. When calculated, a self-similar solution exists, and the governing equations can be simplified to only one dimension i.e. along the axis of the fuel and oxidizer jets. It is in this direction where complex chemistry calculations can be performed affordably.

== Logic and formulae ==
To model a non-premixed combustion, governing equations for fluid elements are required. The conservation equation for the species mass fraction is as follows:-

${\partial Y_k\over\partial t}= {\chi \over 2}{1\over Le_k}\biggl({\partial^2 Y_k\over\partial Z^2}\biggr) + {\omega_k \over \rho}$	1

Le_{k} → lewis number of kth species and the above formula was derived with keeping constant heat capacity. The energy equation with variable heat capacity:-

${c_p}{\partial T\over\partial t}= {\chi \over 2}\biggl({\partial^2 h\over\partial Z^2}\biggr) - {\sum_{k=1}^N h_k} \biggl\{ {\chi \over 2}{\partial^2 Y_k\over\partial Z^2} + {\omega_k \over \rho}\biggr\}$	2

As can be seen from above formulas that the mass fraction and temperature are dependent on

1. Mixture fraction Z

2. Scalar dissipation χ

3. Time

The unsteady terms in above equation are often neglected and it is assumed that the local flame structure has a balance between steady chemical equations and steady diffusion equation which results in Steady Laminar Flamelet Models (SLFM). For this, an average value of χ is computed known as Favre value

${\widetilde{\chi}_{st}} = {\widetilde{\chi} \over \int\limits_0^1 \frac{F(Z)}{F(Z_{st})}\ P(Z)\,dZ}$	3

$F(Z) = \exp \bigl(-2 \bigl[ \operatorname{erfc}^{-1}(2Z) \bigr]^2 \bigr)$	3

The basic assumption of a SLFM model is that a turbulent flame front behaves locally as a one dimensional, steady and laminar which proves to be a very useful while reducing the situation to a much simpler terms but it does create problems as few of the effects are not accounted for.

== Advantages ==
The advantages of using this combustion model are as follows:

1. They have the advantage of showing strong coupling between chemical reactions and molecular transport.

2. The steady laminar flamelet model is also used to predict chemical non-equilibrium due to aerodynamic straining of the flame by the turbulence.

== Disadvantages ==
The disadvantages of Steady Laminar Flamelet model due to above mentioned reason are:

1. It does not account for the curvature effects which can change the flame structure and is more detrimental while the structure hasn’t reached the quasi-steady state.

2. Such transient effects also arise in turbulent flow, the scalar dissipation experience a sudden change. As the flame structure take time to get stabilize.

To improve the above SLFM models, few more models has been proposed like Transient laminar flamelet model (TLFM) by Ferreira.
