= Williams spray equation =

In combustion, the Williams spray equation, also known as the Williams–Boltzmann equation, describes the statistical evolution of sprays contained in another fluid, analogous to the Boltzmann equation for the molecules, named after Forman A. Williams, who derived the equation in 1958.

== Mathematical description ==
The sprays are assumed to be spherical with radius $r$, even though the assumption is valid for solid particles(liquid droplets) when their shape has no consequence on the combustion. For liquid droplets to be nearly spherical, the spray has to be dilute(total volume occupied by the sprays is much less than the volume of the gas) and the Weber number $We = 2r\rho_g|\mathbf{v}-\mathbf{u}|^2/\sigma$, where $\rho_g$ is the gas density, $\mathbf{v}$ is the spray droplet velocity, $\mathbf{u}$ is the gas velocity and $\sigma$ is the surface tension of the liquid spray, should be $We \ll 10$.

The equation is described by a number density function $f_j(r,\mathbf{x},\mathbf{v},T,t) \, dr \, d\mathbf{x} \, d\mathbf{v}\,dT$, which represents the probable number of spray particles (droplets) of chemical species $j$ (of $M$ total species), that one can find with radii between $r$ and $r+dr$, located in the spatial range between $\mathbf{x}$ and $\mathbf{x}+d\mathbf{x}$, traveling with a velocity in between $\mathbf{v}$ and $\mathbf{v}+d\mathbf{v}$, having the temperature in between $T$ and $T+dT$ at time $t$. Then the spray equation for the evolution of this density function is given by

$$\frac{\partial f_j}{\partial t} + \nabla_x\cdot(\mathbf{v}f_j) + \nabla_v \cdot(F_jf_j) =- \frac{\partial }{\partial r}(R_jf_j) - \frac{\partial }{\partial T}(E_jf_j) + Q_j + \Gamma_j, \quad j = 1,2,\ldots,M.$$

where

$F_j = \left(\frac{d\mathbf{v}}{dt}\right)_j$ is the force per unit mass acting on the $j^\text{th}$ species spray (acceleration applied to the sprays),

$R_j=\left(\frac{dr}{dt}\right)_j$ is the rate of change of the size of the $j^\text{th}$ species spray,

$E_j=\left(\frac{dT}{dt}\right)_j$ is the rate of change of the temperature of the $j^\text{th}$ species spray due to heat transfer,

$Q_j$ is the rate of change of number density function of $j^\text{th}$ species spray due to nucleation, liquid breakup etc.,

$\Gamma_j$ is the rate of change of number density function of $j^\text{th}$ species spray due to collision with other spray particles.

== A simplified model for liquid propellant rocket ==
This model for the rocket motor was developed by Probert, Williams and Tanasawa. It is reasonable to neglect $Q_j, \ \Gamma_j$, for distances not very close to the spray atomizer, where major portion of combustion occurs. Consider a one-dimensional liquid-propellent rocket motor situated at $x=0$, where fuel is sprayed. Neglecting $E_j$(density function is defined without the temperature so accordingly dimensions of $f_j$ changes) and due to the fact that the mean flow is parallel to $x$ axis, the steady spray equation reduces to

$$\frac{\partial }{\partial r}(R_jf_j) + \frac{\partial }{\partial x}(u_j f_j) + \frac{\partial }{\partial u_j}(F_jf_j) = 0$$

where $u_j$ is the velocity in $x$ direction. Integrating with respect to the velocity results

$$\frac{\partial }{\partial r}\left(\int R_j f_j \, d u_j \right) + \frac{\partial }{\partial x} \left(\int u_j f_j \, d u_j \right) + [F_jf_j]_0^\infty =0$$

The contribution from the last term (spray acceleration term) becomes zero (using Divergence theorem) since $f_j\rightarrow 0$ when $u$ is very large, which is typically the case in rocket motors. The drop size rate $R_j$ is well modeled using vaporization mechanisms as

$$R_j = -\frac{\chi_j}{r^{k_j}}, \quad \chi_j \geq 0, \quad 0\leq k_j \leq 1$$

where $\chi_j$ is independent of $r$, but can depend on the surrounding gas. Defining the number of droplets per unit volume per unit radius and average quantities averaged over velocities,

$$G_j = \int f_j \, du_j, \quad \bar{R}_j = \frac{\int R_j f_j \, d u_j}{G_j}, \quad \bar{u}_j = \frac{\int u_j f_j \, d u_j}{G_j}$$

the equation becomes

$$\frac{\partial }{\partial r}(\bar{R}_jG_j) + \frac{\partial }{\partial x}(\bar{u}_j G_j) =0.$$

If further assumed that $\bar{u}_j$ is independent of $r$, and with a transformed coordinate

$\eta_j = \left[r^{k_j+1} + (k_j+1) \int_0^x \frac{\chi_j}{\bar{u}_j} \, dx \right]^{1/(k_j+1)}$

If the combustion chamber has varying cross-section area $A(x)$, a known function for $x>0$ and with area $A_o$ at the spraying location, then the solution is given by

$$G_j(\eta_j) = G_{j,o}(\eta_j)\frac{A_o \bar{u}_{j,o}}{A\bar{u}_j} \left(\frac{r}{\eta_j}\right)^{k_j}$$.

where $G_{j,0} = G_j(r,0), \ \bar{u}_{j,0} = \bar{u}_j(x=0)$ are the number distribution and mean velocity at $x=0$ respectively.

== See also ==
- Boltzmann equation
- Spray (liquid drop)
- Liquid-propellant rocket
- Smoluchowski coagulation equation
