= Mass-flux fraction =

Ratio of mass-flux of chemical species to total mass flux

The mass-flux fraction (or Hirschfelder-Curtiss variable or Kármán-Penner variable) is the ratio of mass-flux of a particular chemical species to the total mass flux of a gaseous mixture. It includes both the convectional mass flux and the diffusional mass flux. It was introduced by Joseph O. Hirschfelder and Charles F. Curtiss in 1948 and later by Theodore von Kármán and Sol Penner in 1954. The mass-flux fraction of a species i is defined as

$$\epsilon_i = \frac{\rho_i (v+ V_i)}{\rho v} = Y_i\left(1+\frac{V_i}{v}\right)$$

where

- $Y_i=\rho_i/\rho$ is the mass fraction
- $v$ is the mass average velocity of the gaseous mixture
- $V_i$ is the average velocity with which the species i diffuse relative to $v$
- $\rho_i$ is the density of species i
- $\rho$ is the gas density.

It satisfies the identity

$$\sum_i \epsilon_i =1$$,

similar to the mass fraction, but the mass-flux fraction can take both positive and negative values. This variable is used in steady, one-dimensional combustion problems in place of the mass fraction. For one-dimensional ($x$ direction) steady flows, the conservation equation for the mass-flux fraction reduces to

$$\frac{d\epsilon_i}{dx} = \frac{w_i}{\rho v}$$,

where $w_i$ is the mass production rate of species i.
