= Mari Strachan =

Welsh writer

Mari Strachan (born 1945) is a Welsh novelist and librarian. Her first novel, The Earth Hums in B Flat (Canongate, 2009), works on one level as a detective story, while on another dealing with the problems of growing up in a small Welsh village in the 1950s, and more generally with the influence of the past on the present.

== Personal life ==
Mari Strachan was born in Harlech, and raised in a Welsh-speaking family. Her father was a bricklayer and stonemason, while her mother, who had left school at 14, cleaned for a living. After leaving the Welsh-medium secondary school Ysgol Ardudwy in Harlech, she graduated in history and English from Cardiff University and then qualified as a chartered librarian, working as such until her retirement. She was 61 when her first novel appeared.

Strachan and her husband live on a smallholding in Ceredigion, West Wales. She says her children were "quite excited" by her success, and one of her grandchildren, credited at the front of her first novel, was delighted to see his name alongside its many translated languages. "I always write in English because I was educated in English although my first language is Welsh," she told an interviewer. "I find it very hard to write for adults in Welsh. I don't feel it's accurate enough. There is still a gap between spoken and written Welsh."

== Novels ==
Encouragement to take up novel-writing in retirement came from a Masters' Course at Manchester Metropolitan University, which "made me focus on my own writing" rather than "trying to imitate other writers whose books I admired."

The 11-year-old protagonist Gwenni of The Earth Hums in B Flat, Strachan's first book, "is not based on a real person.... Sometimes I think that maybe she's the child I wish I had been. I grew up in the 1950s... and was taught that it was impolite to contradict or argue with anyone. Gwenni is not afraid to ask questions even when she knows it'll cause trouble for her, and she's not afraid to do what she believes is the right thing."

Translation rights to it have been sold for at least twelve languages. American rights have also been sold, to Grove Atlantic. The Guardian noted in a review of it her "deft handling of a dark subject... both sober and sparkling." It was read as the BBC Radio 4 Book at Bedtime in April 2009, while being chosen for Waterstones' New Voices and winning an Amazon Rising Star award the same spring.

Its Scottish publisher Canongate Books issued her second novel, Blow on a Dead Man's Embers, in 2011. (An edition in 2012 appeared as Dead Man's Embers.) It owes something to her grandfather's experience of shell shock in telling of a traumatised Welsh First World War returnee from the armed forces and his family, in "a distinctive and potent treatment" of the "lingering sorrow of war", according to The Times Literary Supplement.
