= David Silvester =

British numerical analyst

- Born: David James Silvester; 26 December 1958 (age 67); Dumfries, Scotland
- Citizenship: United Kingdom
- Education: University of Manchester Institute of Science and Technology (UMIST)
- Scientific career
- Fields: Mathematics; Numerical analysis; Numerical linear algebra; Mathematical software
- Workplaces: University of Manchester
- Thesis: An Analysis of Finite Element Approximation for Swirling Flow (1983)
- Doctoral advisor: Ronald Thatcher
- Website: personalpages.manchester.ac.uk/staff/david.silvester/

David James Silvester (born 26 December 1958) is a British numerical analyst. He has a Chair in Numerical Analysis and is the former Head of Applied Mathematics in the Department of Mathematics at the University of Manchester.

Silvester was born in Dumfries, but was educated at Ysgol Ardudwy (Wales) and the University of Manchester Institute of Science and Technology (UMIST), from which he gained his B.Sc. in Mathematics (1980) and Ph.D. in Numerical Analysis (1983). His Ph.D. thesis (An Analysis of Finite Element Approximation for Swirling Flow) was supervised by Ronald Thatcher. He was appointed lecturer in Mathematics at UMIST in 1984, and later promoted to Senior Lecturer and Reader. In 2003 he was promoted to a personal Chair of Numerical Analysis. Silvester held visiting positions in the Computer Science Department at Stanford University in 1991 (as a Fulbright Senior Fellow) and in 1999, at the University of Maryland (1994), the University of the Littoral Opal Coast (2009), and the University of Heidelberg (2019).

Silvester is best known for his work on finite element methods, fast iterative solvers for fluid dynamics, and uncertainty quantification. He has more than 65 refereed publications on topics such as iterative solution of Stokes and Navier–Stokes systems, preconditioning, and error estimation in finite element methods. Silvester's books include Finite Elements and Fast Iterative Solvers: With Applications in Incompressible Fluid Dynamics and Essential Partial Differential Equations (co-authored with David F. Griffiths and John W. Dold).

Silvester has served as the elected President of the UK and Republic of Ireland section of the Society for Industrial and Applied Mathematics (2009–2011). He became a Fellow of the Society for Industrial and Applied Mathematics in 2023. He is on the editorial board of the Journal of Scientific Computing.
