= Gregory Sivashinsky =

- Born: October 21, 1945 (age 80); Moscow, Soviet Union
- Education: Moscow State University; Technion – Israel Institute of Technology
- Known for: Kuramoto–Sivashinsky equation Michelson–Sivashinsky equation Joulin–Sivashinsky equation Rakib–Sivashinsky equation
- Scientific career
- Fields: Combustion; Mathematical physics
- Workplaces: Moscow State University; Technion – Israel Institute of Technology; Tel Aviv University

Gregory I. Sivashinsky (also known as Grisha) is a professor at Tel Aviv University, working in the field of combustion and theoretical physics.

== Biography ==
Sivashinsky was born in Moscow to Israel and Tatiana Sivashinsky. He is married to Terry Sivashinsky. He finished his master's degree at Moscow State University in 1967 and worked as a research assistant there until 1971. He emigrated to Israel in 1971. He was a pupil of Grigory Isaakovich Barenblatt and Yakov Borisovich Zel'dovich. He completed his PhD at Technion – Israel Institute of Technology in 1973 and worked as a lecturer there for two years. He joined Tel Aviv University in 1974 and settled there. He is the recipient of Ya.B. Zeldovich Gold Medal from The Combustion Institute and a fellow of The Combustion Institute.

== See also ==
- Norbert Peters
- Forman A. Williams
- Moshe Matalon
- John D. Buckmaster
- Amable Liñán
- Paul Clavin
