= Robert Penner =

American mathematician

Robert Clark Penner
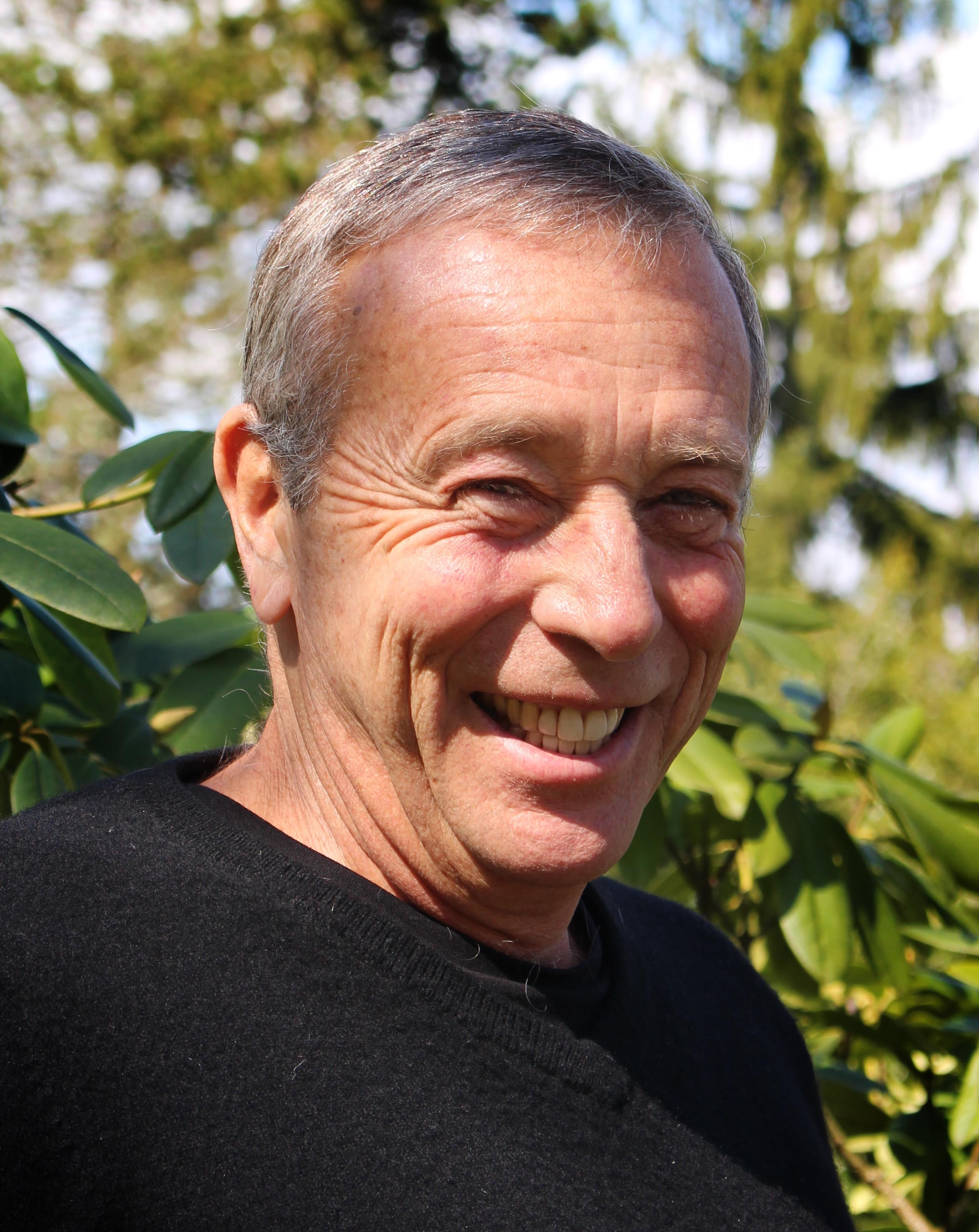
- Born: August 10, 1956 (age 70); Los Angeles, California, United States
- Education: Cornell University; Massachusetts Institute of Technology
- Father: Sol Penner
- Scientific career
- Fields: Mathematics; Physics; Biology
- Workplaces: Princeton University; Mittag-Leffler Institute; University of Southern California; Aarhus University; Institut des Hautes Etudes Scientifiques
- Thesis: A computation of the action of the mapping class group on isotopy classes of curves and arcs in surfaces (1981)
- Doctoral advisor: James Munkres; David Gabai

Robert Clark Penner is an American mathematician whose work in geometry and combinatorics has found applications in high-energy physics and more recently in theoretical biology. He is the son of Sol Penner, an aerospace engineer.

== Biography ==
Robert Clark Penner received his B.S. degree from Cornell University in 1977 and his Ph.D. from the Massachusetts Institute of Technology in 1981, the latter under the direction of James Munkres and David Gabai. In his doctoral studies, he solved a 50 year old problem posed by Max Dehn on the action of the mapping class group on curves and arcs in surfaces, developed combinatorial aspects of Thurston's theory of train tracks and generalized Thurston's construction of pseudo-Anosov maps.

After postdoctoral positions at Princeton University and at the Mittag-Leffler Institute, Penner spent most of the period of 1985–2003 at the University of Southern California. From 2004 until 2012, he worked at Aarhus University, where he co-founded with Jørgen Ellegaard Andersen the Center for the Quantum Geometry of Moduli Spaces. Since 2013 Penner has held the position of the René Thom Chair in Mathematical Biology at the Institut des Hautes Etudes Scientifiques.

Throughout his career Penner held various visiting positions around the world including Harvard University, Stanford University, Max-Planck-Institut für Mathematik at Bonn, University of Tokyo, Mittag-Leffler Institute, Caltech, UCLA, Fields Institute, University of Chicago, ETH Zurich, University of Bern, University of Helsinki, University of Strasbourg, University of Grenoble, Nonlinear Institute of Nice-Sophia Antipolis.

== Contributions to mathematics, physics, and biology ==
Penner's research began in the theory of train tracks including a generalization of Thurston's original construction of pseudo-Anosov maps to the so-called Penner-Thurston construction, which he used to give estimates on least dilatations. He then co-discovered the so-called Epstein-Penner decomposition of non-compact complete hyperbolic manifolds with David Epstein, in dimension 3 a central tool in knot theory. Over several years he developed the decorated Teichmüller theory of punctured surfaces including the so-called Penner matrix model, the basic partition function for Riemann's moduli space. Extending the foregoing to orientation-preserving homeomorphisms of the circle, Penner developed his model of universal Teichmüller theory together with its Lie algebra. He discovered combinatorial cocycles with Shigeyuki Morita for the first and with Nariya Kawazumi for the higher Johnson homomorphisms. Penner has also contributed to theoretical biology in joint work with Jørgen E. Andersen et al. discovering a priori geometric constraints on protein geometry, and with Michael S. Waterman, Piotr Sulkowski, Christian Reidys et al. introducing and solving the matrix model for RNA topology.

== Main journal publications ==
- Penner, R. C. (1987). "The decorated Teichmüller space of punctured surfaces". Communications in Mathematical Physics. 113 (2): 299–339. doi:10.1007/BF01223515. S2CID 120198031.
- Epstein, D.B.A.; Penner, R. C. (1988). "Euclidean decompositions of noncompact hyperbolic manifolds". Journal of Differential Geometry. 27 (1): 67–80. doi:10.4310/jdg/1214441650.
- Penner, R. C. (1988). "Perturbative series and the moduli space of Riemann surfaces". Journal of Differential Geometry. 27 (1): 35–53. doi:10.4310/jdg/1214441648.
- Penner, Robert C. (1988). "A construction of pseudo-Anosov homeomorphisms". Transactions of the American Mathematical Society. 310 (1): 179–197. doi:10.1090/S0002-9947-1988-0930079-9.
- Penner, R. C. (1991). "Bounds on least dilatations". Proceedings of the American Mathematical Society. 113 (2): 443–450. doi:10.1090/S0002-9939-1991-1068128-8.
- Penner, R. C. (1992). "Weil-Petersson volumes". Journal of Differential Geometry. 35 (3): 559–608. doi:10.4310/jdg/1214448257.
- Penner, R. C. (1993). "Universal constructions in Teichmüller theory". Advances in Mathematics. 98 (2): 143–215. doi:10.1006/aima.1993.1015.
- Penner, R. C. (1996). "The geometry of the Gauss product". Journal of Mathematical Sciences. 81 (3): 2700–2718. doi:10.1007/BF02362336.
- Penner, R. C.; Waterman, Michael S. (1993). "Spaces of RNA secondary structures". Advances in Mathematics. 101 (1): 31–49. doi:10.1006/aima.1993.1039.
- Papadopoulos, Athanase; Penner, R. C. (1991). "La forme symplectique de Weil-Petersson et le bord de Thurston de l'espace de Teichmüller". Comptes rendus de l'Académie des Sciences. Série I. 312: 871–874.
- Kaufmann, Ralph; Penner, R. C. (2006). "Closed/open string diagrammatics". Nuclear Physics B. 748 (3): 335–379. arXiv:math/0603485. doi:10.1016/j.nuclphysb.2006.03.036. S2CID 14428342.
- Morita, S.; Penner, R. C. (2008). "Torelli groups, extended Johnson homomorphisms, and new cycles on the moduli space of curves". Mathematical Proceedings of the Cambridge Philosophical Society. 144 (3): 651–671. arXiv:math/0602461. doi:10.1017/S0305004107000990. S2CID 13633256.
- Bene, Alex James; Kawazumi, Nariya; Penner, R. C. (2009). "Canonical extensions of the Johnson homomorphisms to the Torelli groupoid". Advances in Mathematics. 221 (2): 627–659. arXiv:0707.2984. doi:10.1016/j.aim.2009.01.004.
- Penner, Robert C.; Andersen, Ebbe S.; Jensen, Jens L.; Kantcheva, Adriana K.; Bublitz, Maike; Nissen, Poul; Rasmussen, Anton M. H.; Svane, Katrine L.; Hammer, Bjørk; Rezazadegan, Reza; Nielsen, Niels Chr.; Nielsen, Jakob T.; Andersen, Jørgen E. (2014). "Hydrogen bond rotations as a uniform structural tool for analyzing protein architecture". Nature Communications. 5: 5803. doi:10.1038/ncomms6803. PMID 25517704.
- Reidys, Christian M.; Huang, Fenix W. D.; Andersen, Jørgen E.; Penner, Robert C.; Stadler, Peter F.; Nebel, Markus E. (2011). "Topology and prediction of RNA pseudoknots". Bioinformatics. 27 (8): 1076–1085. doi:10.1093/bioinformatics/btr090. PMID 21335320.
- Andersen, Jørgen E.; Chekhov, Leonid O.; Penner, R. C.; Reidys, Christian M.; Sułkowski, Piotr (2012). "Topological recursion for chord diagrams, RNA complexes, and cells in moduli spaces". Nuclear Physics B. 866 (3): 414–443. arXiv:1205.0658. doi:10.1016/j.nuclphysb.2012.09.012. S2CID 10826116.
- Penner, R. C. (2016). "Moduli spaces and macromolecules". Bulletin of the American Mathematical Society. 53 (2): 217–268. doi:10.1090/bull/1524.
- Penner, R. C.; Zeitlin, Anton M. (2019). "Decorated super-Teichmüller space". Journal of Differential Geometry. 111 (3): 527–566. arXiv:1509.06302. doi:10.4310/jdg/1552442609. S2CID 119664779.

== Books ==
- with the assistance of J. L. Harer: Combinatorics of Train Tracks, Annals of Mathematics Studies 125, Princeton University Press (1992); second printing (2001).
- Perspectives in Mathematical Physics, International Press, edited by R. C. Penner and Shing-Tung Yau (1994).
- Discrete Mathematics--proof techniques and mathematical structures, World Scientific Publishing Company (1999); second printing (2001).
- Woods Hole Mathematics: perspectives in math and physics, edited by N. Tongring and R. C. Penner, foreword by Raul Bott, World Scientific Publishing Company (2004).
- Groups of Diffeomorphisms-in honor of Shigeyuki Morita on the occasion of his 60th birthday, Advanced Studies in Pure Mathematics 52 (2008), Mathematical Society of Japan, edited by R. C. Penner, D. Kotschick, T. Tsuboi, N. Kawazumi, T. Kitano, Y. Mitsumatsu.
- Decorated Teichmüller theory, (with a foreword by Yuri I. Manin), QGM Master Class Series, European Mathematical Society, Zürich, 2012, xviii+360 pp. ISBN 978-3-03719-075-3.
- Topology and K-theory: Lectures by Daniel Quillen, Notes by Robert Penner, Springer-Verlag Lecture Notes in Mathematics (2020)

== Patents ==
Methods of Digital Filtering and Multi-Dimensional Data Compression Using the Farey Quadrature and Arithmetic, Fan, and Modular Wavelets, US Patent 7,158,569 (granted 2Jan07)

== Philanthropy ==
In 2018 Penner endowed the Alexzandria Figueroa and Robert Penner Chair at the IHES in memoriam of Alexzandria Figueroa.
