= Carlos Fernández-Pello =

- Education: Technical University of Madrid; University of California, San Diego
- Scientific career
- Fields: Combustion
- Workplaces: Harvard University; Princeton University; Northwestern University; University of California, Berkeley
- Thesis: Laminar flame spread over flat solid surfaces (1975)
- Doctoral advisor: Forman A. Williams

Carlos Fernández-Pello (born in Asturias, Spain) is a faculty member of the University of California, Berkeley, Department of Mechanical Engineering. He also serves as an associate dean in the Graduate Division at Berkeley, where he oversees the Graduate Diversity Program, the American Indian Graduate Program, Graduate Division’s academic services, fellowships, publications, and websites. His research interests are in combustion, heat and mass transfer, microgravity combustion, micro and meso-scale combustion, ignition and flame propagation, smouldering and transition to flaming combustion. Fernández-Pello has been involved in teaching and research activities since the 1970s in different institutions.

== Career and research ==
Carlos Fernández-Pello received his Ph.D. from University of California, San Diego in 1975 under the supervision of Forman A. Williams. Earlier, he received his M.Sc. degree (1973) at U.C. San Diego, and his Bachelor at Universidad Politécnica de Madrid (Spain, 1968). After working as a postdoctoral researcher at Harvard, Princeton University and Northwestern University, he joined UC Berkeley in 1980. Since then, he has held the following academic positions: associate dean of the Graduate Division (since 2003), vice-chairman of graduate matters, Mechanical Engineering Department (1997–2000), vice-chairman Graduate Council (2000–2001), professor (since 1986), and associate professor (1982–1986).

He has served as an engineer in the industry at SENER (Spain). He is a Fellow of The Spanish Royal Academy of Engineering, The American Society of Mechanical Engineers, The Combustion Institute, and the American Institute of Aeronautics and Astronautics. Also, he had been a member of the Universities Space Research Association, the Microgravity Science and Applications Council, the board of directors of the Center for Pure and Applied Mathematics at UC Berkeley, the NASA Space Station Science and Applications Advisory Committee, and of the Lawrence Livermore National Laboratory. He is an active member of the editorial advisory board of journals in the field of combustion.

Fernández-Pello has research experience in several topics of combustion, but he is better known for his contributions in three main topics: Flame spread over solid fuels, smouldering combustion and microscale combustion.
