= G equation =

In Combustion, G equation is a scalar $G(\mathbf{x},t)$ field equation which describes the instantaneous flame position, introduced by Forman A. Williams in 1985 in the study of premixed turbulent combustion. The equation is derived based on the Level-set method. The equation was first studied by George H. Markstein, in a restrictive form for the burning velocity and not as a level set of a field. The G equation reads

$$\rho \left(\frac{\partial G}{\partial t} + \mathbf{v}\cdot\nabla G \right)= \dot m |\nabla G|$$

where $\rho$ is the flow density, $v$ is the flow velocity and $\dot m=\dot m(\mathbf{x},t)$ is the normal mass flux entering any particular level set $G(\mathbf{x},t)=$constant.

== Mathematical description ==
The G equation reads as

$$\frac{\partial G}{\partial t} + \mathbf{v}\cdot\nabla G = S_T |\nabla G|$$

where

- $\mathbf{v}$ is the flow velocity field,
- $S_T=\dot m/\rho_u$ is the local burning velocity with respect to the unburnt gas with density $\rho_u$.

The flame location is given by $G(\mathbf{x},t)=G_o$ which can be defined arbitrarily such that $G(\mathbf{x},t)>G_o$ is the region of burnt gas and $G(\mathbf{x},t)<G_o$ is the region of unburnt gas. The normal vector to the flame, pointing towards the burnt gas, is $\mathbf{n}=\nabla G /|\nabla G|$.

The G equation has the form of the Hamilton-Jacobi equation, an equation in analytical mechanics used to model particle dynamics as propagation of waves.

=== Local burning velocity ===
According to Matalon–Matkowsky–Clavin–Joulin theory, the burning velocity of the stretched flame, for small curvature and small strain, is given by

$$S_T = S_L + \mathcal{M}_c \delta_L (S_L-\mathbf{v}\cdot\mathbf{n}) \nabla \cdot \mathbf{n} - \mathcal{M}_t \delta_L  \nabla_t\cdot \mathbf{v}_t$$

where

- $S_L$ is the burning velocity of unstretched flame with respect to the unburnt gas
- $\mathcal{M}_c$ and $\mathcal{M}_t$ are the two Markstein numbers, associated with the curvature and tangential straining; $\nabla_t\cdot \mathbf{v}_t=-\mathbf{n}\otimes\mathbf{n}:\nabla\mathbf{v}-(\mathbf{v}\cdot\mathbf{n})\nabla\cdot\mathbf{n}$ is the surface divergence of the tangential velocity $\mathbf{v}_t=(\mathbf{I}-\mathbf{n}\otimes\mathbf{n})\mathbf{v}$
- $\delta_L$ is the laminar flame thickness.

== A simple example - Slot burner ==
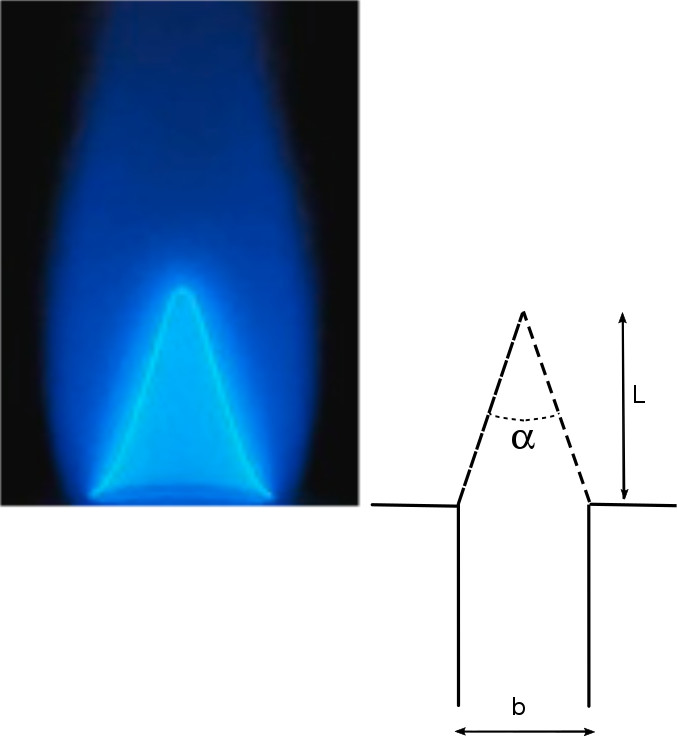
Slot burner

The G equation has an exact expression for a simple slot burner. Consider a two-dimensional planar slot burner of slot width $b$. The premixed reactant mixture is fed through the slot from the bottom with a constant velocity $\mathbf{v}=(0,U)$, where the coordinate $(x,y)$ is chosen such that $x=0$ lies at the center of the slot and $y=0$ lies at the location of the mouth of the slot. When the mixture is ignited, a premixed flame develops from the mouth of the slot to a certain height $y=L$ in the form of a two-dimensional wedge shape with a wedge angle $\alpha$. For simplicity, let us assume $S_T=S_L$, which is a good approximation except near the wedge corner where curvature effects will becomes important. In the steady case, the G equation reduces to

$$U\frac{\partial G}{\partial y} = S_L \sqrt{\left(\frac{\partial G}{\partial x}\right)^2+ \left(\frac{\partial G}{\partial y}\right)^2}$$

If a separation of the form $G(x,y) = y + f(x)$ is introduced, then the equation becomes

$$U = S_L\sqrt{1+ \left(\frac{\partial f}{\partial x}\right)^2}, \quad \Rightarrow \quad \frac{\partial f}{\partial x} = \frac{\sqrt{U^2-S_L^2}}{S_L}$$

which upon integration gives

$$f(x) = \frac{\left(U^2-S_L^2\right)^{1/2}}{S_L}|x| + C, \quad \Rightarrow \quad G(x,y) = \frac{\left(U^2-S_L^2\right)^{1/2}}{S_L}|x| + y+ C$$

Without loss of generality choose the flame location to be at $G(x,y)=G_o=0$. Since the flame is attached to the mouth of the slot $|x| = b/2, \ y=0$, the boundary condition is $G(b/2,0)=0$, which can be used to evaluate the constant $C$. Thus the scalar field is

$$G(x,y) = \frac{\left(U^2-S_L^2\right)^{1/2}}{S_L}\left(|x|- \frac{b}{2}\right) + y$$

At the flame tip, we have $x=0, \ y=L, \ G=0$, which enable us to determine the flame height

$$L = \frac{b\left(U^2-S_L^2\right)^{1/2}}{2S_L}$$

and the flame angle $\alpha$,

$$\tan \alpha = \frac{b/2}{L} = \frac{S_T}{\left(U^2-S_L^2\right)^{1/2}}$$

Using the trigonometric identity $\tan^2\alpha = \sin^2\alpha/\left(1-\sin^2\alpha\right)$, we have

$$\sin\alpha = \frac{S_L}{U} .$$

In fact, the above formula is often used to determine the planar burning speed $S_L$, by measuring the wedge angle.
