= Flame ball =

Flame balls refer to stationary premixed flame, spherical flame structures that exists due to the balance between radiant heat loss and diffusive-thermal effects. These flame balls are observed typically in microgravity environments where buoyancy effects are negligible and for highly diffusive fuels such as hydrogen that can promote diffusive-thermal effects. The theoretical development of flame ball was carried out by John D. Buckmaster and Guy Joulin.
