= Flame stretch =

In combustion, flame stretch ($K$) is a quantity which measures the amount of stretch of the flame surface due to curvature and due to the outer velocity field strain. The early concept of flame stretch was introduced by Karlovitz in 1953, although the correct definition was introduced by Forman A. Williams in 1975. George H. Markstein studied flame stretch by treating the flame surface as a hydrodynamic discontinuity (known as flame front). The flame stretch is also discussed by Bernard Lewis and Guenther von Elbe in their book. All these discussions treated flame stretch as an effect of flow velocity gradients. The stretch can be found even if there is no velocity gradient, but due to the flame curvature. So, the definition required a more general formulation and its precise definition is given as the ratio of rate of change of flame surface area to the area itself

$$K = \frac{1}{A}\frac{dA}{dt}.$$

When $K>0$, the flame is stretched, otherwise compressed. Sometimes the flame stretch is defined as non-dimensional quantity

$$\tilde K = \frac{\delta_L}{S_L} \frac{1}{A}\frac{dA}{dt}$$

where $\delta_L$ is the laminar flame thickness and $S_L$ is the laminar propagation speed of unstretched premixed flame.

The formula for flame stretch was first derived by John D. Buckmaster in 1979.

== See also ==
- Markstein number
- Matalon–Matkowsky–Clavin–Joulin theory
- G equation
