= Rem Soloukhin =

Soviet physicist (1930–1988)

- Born: 19 November 1930; Gus-Khrustalny, Russian SFSR, Soviet Union
- Died: 6 January 1988 (aged 57); Minsk, Byelorussian SSR, Soviet Union
- Education: Moscow State University
- Scientific career
- Fields: Physics

Rem Ivanovich Soloukhin (Russian: Рем Иванович Солоухин, 19 November 1930 – 6 January 1988) was a Soviet scientist, specializing in physics and mechanics. Along with Antoni K. Oppenheim (Berkeley) and Numa Manson (Paris), he founded the International Committee on Gasdynamics of Explosions and Reactive Systems (ICDERS) in 1967.

== Biography ==
Rem Soloukhin was born in a teachers' family in Gus-Khrustalny, Soviet Union in 1930. He graduated from Faculty of Physics of Moscow State University in 1953 and became PhD in 1957.

In 1959, Soloukhin, together with Mikhail Lavrentyev, moved to work in Novosibirsk in Akademgorodok, where he developed a scientific direction at the Lavrentyev Institute of Hydrodynamics, which had already begun at the Krzhizhanovsky Energy Institute. In addition, he takes an active part in the creation of the Novosibirsk State University (NSU) and becomes the first dean of the Faculty of Physics, and then vice-rector for scientific and educational work.

In 1967, Soloukhin together with Antoni K. Oppenheim and Numa Manson established the International Committee on Gasdynamics of Explosions and Reactive Systems. He taught at Moscow Institute of Physics and Technology (1958–1959), then became a professor at Novosibirsk State University (1965), the first dean of Faculty of Physics and vice-chancellor (1962–1967).

From 1971 to 1976 he was director of the Institute of Theoretical and Applied Mechanics (ITAM) of the Siberian Branch of the Academy of Sciences of the Soviet Union.

Since 1976, he lived and worked in Minsk.

From 1976 to 1987 he was director of the A. V. Lykov Institute of Heat and Mass Transfer of the Academy of Sciences of the BSSR and head of the Department of Thermal Physics at BSU named after V. I. Lenin.

Rem Soloukhin explored physics of combustion, explosion, and shock waves. Also, he was interested in gas dynamics and became the author of more than 400 scientific works. Soloukhin was awarded the Lenin Prize (1965), Order of the October Revolution (1980), Order of the Red Banner of Labour (1967), and two Orders of the Badge of Honour (1961, 1975). In his memory, the grants for students of Novosibirsk State University and the international award for the best experimental work of Soloukhin's name were established.
