= Stanford S. Penner =

- Born: July 5, 1921; Unna, Germany
- Died: July 15, 2016 (aged 95); La Jolla, California, U.S.
- Citizenship: German; American
- Education: Union College, University of Wisconsin–Madison
- Known for: Kármán–Penner mass-flux fraction
- Spouse: Beverly Penner
- Children: Robert Clark Penner; Lynn Jean Penner
- Scientific career
- Fields: Aerospace Engineering
- Workplaces: California Institute of Technology, University of California, San Diego
- Thesis: I. National Defense Research Council Project (Confidential); II. Calculations on the formation and decomposition of Nitric-oxide in pebble beds at high temperature. (1946)
- Doctoral advisor: Farrington Daniels
- Doctoral students: Forman A. Williams

Stanford Solomon Penner (5 July 1921 – 15 July 2016) also known as Sol Penner, was a German-American scientist and engineer, a major figure in combustion physics, especially in rocket engines, and a founder of the Engineering program at University of California, San Diego. He obtained his PhD in 1946 from the University of Wisconsin–Madison under Farrington Daniels and Theodore von Kármán.

== Biography ==
Stanford S. Penner was born on July 5, 1921, in Unna, Germany, a small town in the North Rhine-Westphalia region of Germany. He moved to the U.S. when he was 15 and he earned his bachelor's degree in chemistry at Union College in New York in 1942. He obtained his PhD from the University of Wisconsin–Madison under the supervision of Farrington Daniels and Theodore von Kármán, specializing in the development of rocket engines, and became a researcher at Jet Propulsion Laboratory after finishing his doctorate.

After working as a research engineer at Jet Propulsion Laboratory from 1946 to 1950, he became the Professor of Jet Propulsion at Caltech from 1950 to 1964. At 1964, he came to UCSD as a founding chair of the UCSD's first engineering department. In 1972, he created the Center for Energy Research at UCSD as a place for researchers from across campus and around the world to come together to pursue critical, interdisciplinary energy research.

Penner died at his home in La Jolla on July 15, 2016, at the age of 95.

== Research ==
Penner collaborated with Theodore von Kármán in the later years of von Kármán life for 15 years. The Kármán–Penner flux fraction, first introduced by Von Kármán and Penner in 1954, is the fraction of mass flux of a particular chemical species (it is used sometimes in place of species mass fraction). He has received numerous professional honors, including election to the National Academy of Engineering, the American Academy of Arts and Sciences, the International Academy of Astronautics; he has also been awarded the Distinguished Associate Award from the US Department of Energy and the Founders Award from the National Academy of Engineering.

Penner also founded two scientific journals: the Journal of Quantitative Spectroscopy and Radiative Transfer in 1961, serving as chief editor for over 30 years and in 1975 he founded Energy, An International Journal and of the (classified) Journal of Defense Research.

== Publications ==
Penner has published around 320 journals in his lifetime and authored many books and monographs.

=== Books ===
- Penner, S.S. (1955). Introduction to the study of chemical reactions in flow systems. Butterworths Scientific Publications.
- Penner, S.S. (1957). Chemistry Problems in Jet Propulsion. Pergamon Press. ISBN 978-1124019994.
- Penner, S.S. (1959). Quantitative Molecular Spectroscopy and Gas Emissivities. Addison-Wesley Pub. Co.
- Penner, S.S. (1968). Radiation and Reentry. Academic Press. ISBN 978-0124144576.
- Penner, S.S. (1968). Thermodynamics for Scientists and Engineers. Addison-wesley. ISBN 978-0201057652.
- Penner S.S., Icerman L. (1974). Energy: Demands, resources, impact, technology, and policy. Addison-Wesley Publishing Company.
- Penner S.S., Icerman L. (1977). Energy Volume II: Non-nuclear Energy Technologies. Addison-Wesley Publishing Company. ASIN B0006YW3DC.
- Penner S.S. (1978). The AGARD Propulsion and Energetics Panel : 1952 - 1977. Technical editing and reproduction. ISBN 9283512588.
- Penner S.S., Alpert S.B., Bendanillo V. (2013) [1982]. New Sources of Oil and Gas: Gases from Coal; Liquid Fuels from Coal, Shale, Tar Sands, and Heavy Oil Sources. Technical editing and reproduction. ASIN B00HVG5MGS.
- Penner S.S. (2014). The Crowded Scene. XLIBRIS. ISBN 978-1503519961.
- Penner S.S. (2015). The Rejuvination and End of Alois Wimpleton (Faust) with Help From Mefistofeles (the Devil), and Three Beautiful Women (Anita, Therese, Marianne). Dog Ear Publishing, LLC. ISBN 978-1457537967.

== See also ==
- Forman A. Williams
- Paul A. Libby
