= Karlovitz number =

Dimensionless parameter in fluid mechanics

In combustion, the Karlovitz number is defined as the ratio of chemical time scale $t_F$ to Kolmogorov time scale $t_\eta$, named after Béla Karlovitz. The number reads as

$$\mathrm{Ka} = \frac{t_F}{t_\eta}$$.

In premixed turbulent combustion, the chemical time scale can be defined as $t_F = D_T/S_L^2$, where $D_T$ is the thermal diffusivity and $S_L$ is the laminar flame speed and the flame thickness is given by $\delta_L = D_T/S_L$, in which case,

$$\mathrm{Ka} = \frac{\delta_L^2}{\eta^2}$$

where $\eta$ is the Kolmogorov scale. The Karlovitz number is related to Damköhler number as

$$\mathrm{Ka} = \frac{1}{\mathrm{Da}}$$

if the Damköhler number is defined with Kolmogorov scale. If $\mathrm{Ka}<1$, the premixed turbulent flame falls into the category of corrugated flamelets and wrinkled flamelets, otherwise into the thin reaction zone or broken reaction zone flames.

== Klimov–Williams criterion ==
In premixed turbulent combustion, the Klimov–Williams criterion or Klimov–Williams limit, named after A.M. Klimov and Forman A. Williams, is the condition where $\mathrm{Ka}=1$ (assuming a Schmidt number of unity). When $\mathrm{Ka}<1$, the flame thickness is smaller than the Kolmogorov scale, thus the flame burning velocity is not affected by the turbulence field. Here, the burning velocity is given by the laminar flame speed and these laminar flamelets are called as wrinkled flamelets or corrugated flamelets, depending on the turbulence intensity. When $\mathrm{Ka}>1$, the turbulent transport penetrates into the preheat zone of the flame (thin reaction zone) or even into the reactive-diffusive zone (distributed flames).
