= Clarke's equation =

Equation that calculates gas diffusion across membranes

In combustion, Clarke's equation is a third-order nonlinear partial differential equation, first derived by John Frederick Clarke in 1978. The equation describes the thermal explosion process, including both effects of constant-volume and constant-pressure processes, as well as the effects of adiabatic and isothermal sound speeds. The equation reads as

$$\frac{\partial^2 }{\partial t^2}\left(\frac{\partial \theta}{\partial t}-\gamma \delta e^\theta\right) = \nabla^2 \left(\frac{\partial \theta}{\partial t}-\delta e^\theta\right)$$

or, alternatively

$$\left(\frac{\partial^2 }{\partial t^2}-\nabla^2\right) \frac{\partial \theta}{\partial t}=  \left(\gamma\frac{\partial^2 }{\partial t^2} - \nabla^2 \right)\delta e^\theta$$

where $\theta$ is the non-dimensional temperature perturbation, $\gamma>1$ is the specific heat ratio and $\delta$ is the relevant Damköhler number. The term $\partial\theta/\partial t-e^\theta$ describes the thermal explosion at constant pressure and the term $\partial\theta/\partial t-\gamma e^\theta$ describes the thermal explosion at constant volume. Similarly, the term $\partial^2/\partial t^2-\nabla^2$ describes the wave propagation at adiabatic sound speed and the term $\gamma\partial^2/\partial t^2-\nabla^2$ describes the wave propagation at isothermal sound speed. Molecular transports are neglected in the derivation.

It may appear that the parameter $\delta$ can be removed from the equation by the transformation $(x,t)\to(\delta x,\delta t)$, it is, however, retained here since $\delta$ may also appear in the initial and boundary conditions.

== Example: Fast, non-diffusive ignition by deposition of a radially symmetric hot source ==
Suppose a radially symmetric hot source is deposited instantaneously in a reacting mixture. When the chemical time is comparable to the acoustic time, diffusion is neglected so that ignition is characterised by heat release by the chemical energy and cooling by the expansion waves. This problem is governed by the Clarke's equation with $\theta=(T_m-T)/\varepsilon T_m$, where $T_m$ is the maximum initial temperature, $T$ is the temperature and $\varepsilon T_m \equiv RT_m^2/E \ll T_m$ is the Frank-Kamenetskii temperature ($R$ is the gas constant and $E$ is the activation energy). Furthermore, let $r$ denote the distance from the center, measured in units of initial hot core size and $t$ be the time, measured in units of acoustic time. In this case, the initial and boundary conditions are given by

$$t=0:\,-\theta=r^2, \quad r=0:\, \frac{\partial \theta}{\partial r} =0, \quad r\gg 1:\,-\theta=r^2 +(j+1)\frac{\gamma-1}{\gamma} t^2,$$

where $j=(0,1,2)$, respectively, corresponds to the planar, cylindrical and spherical problems. Let us define a new variable

$$\varphi(r,t) = \theta +r^2 + (j+1)\frac{\gamma-1}{\gamma} t^2$$

which is the increment of $\theta(r,t)$ from its distant values. Then, at small times, the asymptotic solution is given by

$$\varphi = \gamma\delta t e^{-r^2} + \frac{1}{2}(\gamma\delta t)^2e^{-2r^2} + \cdots$$

As time progresses, a steady state is approached when $\delta\leq \delta_c$ and a thermal explosion is found to occur when $\delta>\delta_c$, where $\delta_c$ is the Frank-Kamenetskii parameter; if $\gamma=1.4$, then $\delta_c=0.50340$ in the planar case, $\delta_c = 0.73583$ in the cylindrical case and $\delta_c=0.91448$ in the spherical case. For $\delta\gg \delta_c$, the solution in the first approximation is given by

$$\varphi=-\ln(1-\gamma\delta t e^{-r^2})$$

which shows that thermal explosion occurs at $t=t_i\equiv 1/(\gamma\delta)$, where $t_i$ is the ignition time.

== Generalised form ==
For generalised form for the reaction term, one may write

$$\left(\frac{\partial^2 }{\partial t^2}-\nabla^2\right) \frac{\partial \theta}{\partial t}=  \left(\gamma\frac{\partial^2 }{\partial t^2} - \nabla^2 \right)\delta\omega(\theta)$$

where $\omega(\theta)$ is arbitrary function representing the reaction term.

== See also ==
- Frank-Kamenetskii theory
