= Solodukhin =

Solodukhin (Russian: Солодухин) is a Russian masculine surname, its feminine counterpart is Solodukhina. Notable people with the surname include:

- Nikolai Solodukhin (born 1955), Russian judoka
- Pyotr Solodukhin (1892–1920), Russian military figure
- Vladimir Solodukhin (born 1969), Russian footballer and coach
- Vyacheslav Solodukhin (1950–1980), Soviet ice hockey player
