= Pamela Cook =

American mathematician

L. Pamela Cook
- Born: Leslie Pamela Cook c. 1945 (age 80–81)
- Education: University of Rochester; Cornell University
- Scientific career
- Fields: Mathematics
- Workplaces: University of Delaware
- Thesis: The Asymptotic Behavior as $\epsilon\to 0^+$ of the Solution to $\epsilon\nabla^2w=(\partial / \partial y) w$ on a Rectangle (1971)
- Doctoral advisor: Geoffrey S. S. Ludford

Leslie Pamela Cook-Ioannidis (born c. 1945) is an American mathematician, the Unidel Professor of Mathematical Sciences and Professor of Chemical Engineering at the University of Delaware. She was the president of the Society for Industrial and Applied Mathematics (SIAM) for 2015–2016. Her research concerns fluid dynamics.

== Education and career ==
Cook earned a bachelor's degree from the University of Rochester in 1967, and a master's and a Ph.D. from Cornell University in 1969 and 1971, respectively. Her dissertation, The Asymptotic Behavior as $\epsilon\to 0^+$ of the Solution to $\epsilon\nabla^2w=\partial w/\partial y$ on a Rectangle, was supervised by Geoffrey S. S. Ludford.

After visiting positions at Cornell and the California Institute of Technology, she joined the faculty of the University of California, Los Angeles in 1973. She moved to Delaware in 1983. At the University of Delaware, she was chair of the Department of Mathematical Sciences for nine years before becoming associate dean of engineering. She also served as chair of the university's Commission on the Status of Women.

== Contributions and recognition ==
With Julian Cole, she is the author of the book Transonic Aerodynamics (North-Holland, 1986).

She is a fellow of the American Association for the Advancement of Science and of SIAM.
