= George H. Markstein =

American combustion scientist (1911–2011)

- Born: 22 June 1911; Vienna, Austria
- Died: 21 March 2011 (aged 99); Makawao, Hawaii, U.S.
- Education: Technische Universität Wien
- Known for: Markstein number Flame stretch
- Scientific career
- Fields: Combustion
- Workplaces: Shell; Cornell Aeronautical Laboratory; Factory Mutual Research Corporation
- Thesis: (1937)

George H. Markstein was a combustion scientist, who has made pioneering contributions to flame theory and detonations.

== Biography and research ==
George H. Markstein was born in Vienna, Austria io 22 June 1911. He completed his master's degree in Engineering and Applied Physics in 1935 and a doctorate degree in Technical Science in 1937, both at Technische Universität Wien. After Anschluss in 1938, his family fled Austria, moved to Switzerland, to Portugal and then to Bogotá, Colombia. In Colombia, George worked for Shell as a surveyor, exploring Colombian jungle.

After World War II, George and his family emigrated to the United States in 1946. George then started working for Cornell Aeronautical Laboratory (CAL) in Buffalo, New York. It is here he started working on premixed flame problems and explained, for the first time in 1951, that the flames can be stabilized at short wavelengths due to diffusion and heat conduction, thereby correcting the Darrieus–Landau theory. He also introduced the notion of parametric instability in the context of thermo-acoustic instability in 1950. Here, he also studied the interactions between shock waves and premixed flames. After 25 years at CAL, in 1971, he moved to Factory Mutual Research Corporation and worked on problems for fire spread and radiative transfer.

He retired from Factory Mutual in 1993 and moved to Hawaii with his wife Hedi. He stopped his scientific career after his retirement. He died on 21 March 2011.

== Books ==
- George H. Markstein (1964). Nonsteady Flame Propagation. Pergamon Press. ISBN 978-1483208190.

== Awards and honours ==
He was the recipient of the Silver Combustion Medal (1976) and Bernard Lewis Gold Medal (1986) from The Combustion Institute. The Eastern US States Section of The Combustion Institute issues the award in George's name.
