= John Frederick Clarke =

John Clarke
- Born: John Frederick Clarke; May 1, 1927; Warwick
- Died: June 11, 2013 (aged 86)
- Education: Queen Mary College (BSc, PhD)
- Known for: Clarke's equation Clarke–Riley diffusion flame
- Awards: FRS (1982)
- Scientific career
- Workplaces: English Electric; Armstrong Siddeley; Fleet Air Arm; Cranfield University
- Thesis: An investigation of the forces on a body of revolution in non-steady motion at moderate Mach numbers (1957)
- Academic advisors: Norman A.V. Piercy; Leslie G. Whitehead; Alec David Young
- Doctoral students: Andrew McIntosh; John W. Dold

John Frederick Clarke FRS (1 May 1927 – 11 June 2013) was a professor, an aeronautical engineer, and a pilot.

== Training and education ==
He was trained in the Fleet Air Arm as a Navy Pilot and then in the Royal Air force at Lossiemouth. He left the Navy and worked for a few months at Armstrong Siddeley, then studied aeronautical engineering at Queen Mary University of London in 1949. His thesis advisor Norman A.V. Piercy died in 1953, and he was temporarily advised by Leslie G. Whitehead and then by Alec David Young. He received his PhD in 1957.

== Career ==
Clarke worked for English Electric company from 1955 to 1957. In 1958 he joined Cranfield University as a lecturer and stayed there till 1991. After his retirement he continued to do research for a decade. His research interests included Shock waves, detonations, gas dynamics and flame theory.

== Awards and honours ==
Clarke was elected a Fellow of the Royal Society in 1982. His nomination reads:

Professor Clarke is distinguished particularly for his analytical work on the gas dynamics of reacting flows. He has shown how, in the presence of solid boundaries, flows are affected by dissociation, heat conduction and by relaxation of the internal molecular modes. On flame structure he has used perturbation techniques to obtain realistic models in various geometries and has been able to show good agreement with experimental results; he has also studied explosive atmospheres under the influence of various disturbances. His work on supersonic flow has included analyses of shock structure in reacting gases as well as shockless flow with attached flame sheets. Apart from reacting gases he has worked on unsteady aerodynamics both of wing-bodies and of pipe flows.

== Personal life ==
Clarke married Jean Gentle in 1953.

== Books ==
- John F. Clarke, Malcolm McChesney (1964). The dynamics of real gases. Butterworths. ASIN B0000CM0CN.
- John F. Clarke, Malcolm McChesney (1975). Dynamics of relaxing gases. Butterworths. ISBN 978-0408706674.
- John F. Clarke (1978). Gas dynamics with relaxation effects. Reports on progress in physics, Institute of Physics.
- John F. Clarke (1984). Quasi-steady flames on an evolving atmosphere. College of Aeronautics, Cranfield Institute of Technology.
- E.F. Toro and John F. Clarke (Eds.) (1998). Numerical methods for wave propagation: selected contributions from the workshop held in Manchester, UK, containing the Harten memorial lecture. Springer Science & Business Media. ISBN 978-0792351252.
