= John D. Buckmaster =

British aerospace engineer

- Born: February 2, 1941 (age 85)
- Education: Imperial College London; Cornell University
- Known for: Buckmaster equation Flame stretch Flame ball
- Scientific career
- Fields: Combustion; Fluid dynamics
- Workplaces: University of Illinois at Urbana–Champaign
- Thesis: Some Topics in Magnetohydrodynamics (1969)
- Doctoral advisor: Geoffrey S. S. Ludford

John David Buckmaster is an Emeritus Professor of Department of Aerospace Engineering at University of Illinois, specialized in the field of combustion He finished his bachelor's degree from Imperial College London in 1962 and completed PhD under the supervision of Geoffrey S. S. Ludford from Cornell University in 1969.

== Books ==
- John D. Buckmaster, Geoffrey S.S. Ludford (1982). Theory of Laminar Flames. Cambridge University Press. ISBN 978-0521091923.
- John D. Buckmaster, Geoffrey S.S. Ludford (1983). Lectures on Mathematical Combustion. SIAM. ISBN 978-0898711868.
- John D. Buckmaster (1985). The Mathematics of Combustion. SIAM. ISBN 978-0898710533.
- John D. Buckmaster, Tadao Takeno (1987). Mathematical Modeling in Combustion Science. Springer Berlin Heidelberg. ISBN 978-3662136706.

== Honors ==
John Buckmaster was elected as the fellow of American Physical Society in 1986. He won a Guggenheim Fellowship in 1991. He is also fellow of Institute of Physics (1999), Combustion Institute. He is the recipient of Ya. B. Zeldovich Gold Medal (2004) from Combustion Institute, Alexander von Humboldt U.S. Senior Scientist Award, Propellants and Combustion Prize (2002) from AIAA, etc. The Buckmaster equation is named after him.

== See also ==
- Norbert Peters
- Amable Liñán
- Forman A. Williams
- John Frederick Clarke
- Moshe Matalon
