= Norbert Peters (engineer) =

German combustion engineer (1942–2015)

- Born: 10 July 1942; Linz, Austria
- Died: 4 July 2015 (aged 72)
- Education: Karlsruhe Institute of Technology; Technische Universität Berlin
- Known for: Borghi–Peters diagram Laminar flamelet model Peters four-step chemistry
- Scientific career
- Fields: Combustion; Aerospace Engineering
- Workplaces: Stanford University; RWTH Aachen University
- Thesis: Solving the boundary-layer equations for chemically reacting gases using a multigrid method (1971)
- Doctoral advisor: Alfred Walz; Karl Stephan

Norbert Peters (10 July 1942 – 4 July 2015) was a professor at RWTH Aachen University, Germany and one of the world-wide authorities in the field of combustion engineering. He headed the Institut für Technische Verbrennung (Institute for Combustion Technology).

== Education and career ==
Born in Linz, Austria, he was educated at the Karlsruhe Institute of Technology and later at the Technische Universität Berlin. He worked in Rourkela Steel Plant for six months.

Peters's primary research interest was in the field of combustion science, especially turbulent flames. The interaction between turbulence and combustion constituted an important part of his research. He was author of the book titled Turbulent Combustion, a monograph with excellent but challenging insights on the advances, problems, and active research in the field of combustion in turbulent flow media. He was well known for his ideas on the Laminar flamelet model in turbulent combustion as well as for the systematic generation of reduced reaction mechanisms from detailed reaction mechanisms.

== Books ==
- Norbert Peters (1992). Fifteen lectures on laminar and turbulent combustion.
- Norbert Peters (2000). Turbulent Combustion. Cambridge University Press. ISBN 978-0521660822.

== Awards and honours ==
He had received numerous recognitions for his contributions, including:

- Honorary Doctorate degrees from University of Brussels (1994), Technical University of Darmstadt (2002) and ETH Zurich (2010)
- Zeldovich Medal of Combustion Institute (2002)
- Gottfried Wilhelm Leibniz Prize of Deutsche Forschungsgemeinschaft (1990)
- Member of the United States National Academy of Engineering (since 2002)

== See also ==
- Forman A. Williams
- Amable Liñán
- Paul Clavin
