= Forman A. Williams =

American academic

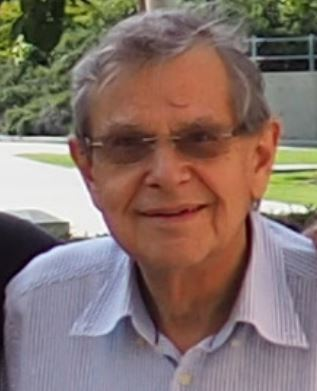
- Born: January 12, 1934 (age 92); New Brunswick, New Jersey, U.S.
- Education: Princeton University; California Institute of Technology
- Known for: G equation Williams–Boltzmann equation Williams diagram Clavin–Williams formula Peters-Williams chemistry Seshadri–Williams formula Activation energy asymptotics Cool flame Klimov-Williams criterion San Diego Mechanism; Flame stretch Combustion instabilities Laminar flamelet model
- Scientific career
- Fields: Fluid dynamics Combustion; Aerospace Engineering
- Workplaces: Harvard University; University of California, San Diego; Princeton University; Yale University
- Thesis: Theoretical Studies In Heterogeneous Combustion (1958)
- Doctoral advisor: Stanford S. Penner
- Doctoral students: Chung K. Law; Carlos Fernández-Pello; Jong S. Kim

Forman Arthur Williams (born January 12, 1934) is an American academic in the field of combustion and aerospace engineering who is Emeritus Professor of Mechanical and Aerospace Engineering at the University of California San Diego.

== Education ==
Williams received his bachelor's degree from Princeton University in 1955 and on Martin Summerfield's advice, he moved to California Institute of Technology to pursue his PhD, graduating it in 1958 under the supervision of Sol Penner, with Richard Feynman on the thesis committee. He presented his PhD thesis to von Kármán at his home, who had influenced Williams greatly.

== Career ==
After finishing his PhD, Williams worked in the Division of Engineering and Applied Physics at Harvard University until 1964, after which he joined the faculty at UCSD. He was the fourth faculty member to be appointed, when Sol Penner founded the Engineering department in University of California, San Diego. In January 1981, he accepted the Robert H. Goddard chair at Princeton, eventually returning to UCSD in 1988. Williams also served as an adjunct Professor at Yale University for one month of each year starting in 1997 and culminating after ten years. He was also the director of Center for Energy Research from 1990 to 2006 at UCSD. He served as a department chair at UCSD for four years.

== Research ==
Williams' research interests includes combustion, propulsion applications, micro-gravity flames etc. He made seminal contributions to the combustion field for the past six decades and considered as one of the prominent scientist in combustion. He wrote the Williams spray equation in 1958 when he was still a PhD student, as a statistical model for spray combustion analogous to Boltzmann equation. Though Activation Energy Asymptotics were known to Russian scientists forty years ago, it was Williams' call in 1971 in Annual Review of Fluid Mechanics which made the western scientific community to start using the analysis. He wrote down the G equation in 1985, a model for premixed turbulent flame as a wrinkled flame. The classification of Combustion instabilities was first introduced by Williams and Barrère in 1969. He introduced the concepts flame stretch and laminar flamelets. Further, he introduced the Williams diagram which classifies different regimes in turbulent combustion.

He worked on number of projects with NASA, Air force and other organizations. He is the principal investigator of the following International Space Station experiments, MDCA (Multi-user Droplet Combustion Apparatus), FSDC (Fiber Supported Droplet Combustion), FSDC-2 (Fiber Supported Droplet Combustion - 2), DCE (Droplet Combustion Experiment), FLEX (Flame Extinguishment Experiment), FLEX-2 (Flame Extinguishment Experiment - 2), Cool Flames Investigation. He conducted lot of experiments, some of his recent experiments include spiral flames in von Kármán swirling flow, ethanol flames, fire spread etc.

== Publications ==
Williams Combustion Theory, second edition published in 1985, is still an authoritative book in the combustion field.

=== Books ===
- Stanford S. Penner, Forman A. Williams (Eds) (1962). Detonation and Two-Phase Flow. Academic Press. ISBN 978-0-12-395556-2.
- Forman A. Williams, Marcel Barrère, N. C. Huang (1969). Fundamental aspects of solid propellant rockets. Technivision Services. "Fundamental aspects of solid propellant rockets" (PDF).
- Paul A. Libby, Forman A. Williams (Eds) (1980). Turbulent reacting flows. Springer. ISBN 978-3-662-31257-5.
- Forman A. Williams (1985). Combustion Theory. Benjamin Cummings. ISBN 978-0201407778.
- Paul C. Fife, Amable Liñán, Forman A. Williams (Eds) (1991). Dynamical Issues in Combustion Theory. Springer. ISBN 978-1461269571.
- Amable Liñán, Forman A. Williams (1993). Fundamental Aspects of Combustion. Oxford University Press. ISBN 978-0195076264.
- Forman A. Williams, A.K. Oppenheim, D.B. Olfe, M. Lapp (Eds) (1993). Modern Developments in Energy, Combustion and Spectroscopy. Pergamon Press. ISBN 978-0080420196.
- Paul A. Libby, Forman A. Williams (Eds) (1994). Turbulent reacting flows. Academic Press. ISBN 978-0124479456.

=== Lecture Notes ===
- Forman A. Williams (1972). Some Mathematical Methods useful in Applied Science.

== Honors ==
Williams is an elected member of National Academy of Engineering (1988) and also in American Academy of Arts and Sciences (2010). He is a fellow of The Combustion Institute. He is elected as a fellow of APS in 2002. He is also a member of AIAA, SIAM etc. He holds an honorary doctorate degree from Technical University of Madrid. He has been in the editorial board of various journals, currently he is in the editorial board of Progress in Energy and Combustion Science, Combustion Science and Technology. He was a member of the National Construction Safety Team Advisory Committee in reporting the Collapse of the World Trade Center. Some of his awards include:

- Guggenheim Fellowship (1970) from John Simon Guggenheim Memorial Foundation
- Silver Combustion Medal (1978) from The Combustion Institute
- Alexander von Humboldt U.S. Senior Scientist Award (1982)
- Bernard Lewis Gold Medal (1990) from The Combustion Institute
- Pendray Aerospace Literature Award (1993) from AIAA
- Numa Manson Medal (1995) from ICDERS
- Thermal Engineering Award for International Activity (1999) from JSME
- Propellants & Combustion Award (2004) from AIAA
- Distinguished Public Service Medal (2017) from NASA

A conference titled Symposium on Advancements in Combustion Theory was conducted at UCSD in 2004 in honor of Williams 70th birthday. Combustion Science and Technology released a special issue in honor of Williams 80th birthday.

== Personal life ==
Forman A. Williams was born on 12 January 1934 in New Jersey, United States, to Forman John Williams Jr. (1912–1988) and Alice Tilton (Pooley) Williams (1912–2000). He spent his childhood in Jamesburg, New Jersey, on Sherman Street, raised in a multigenerational household that included his parents, grandparents and aunts. His paternal aunts are Vera Williams (born 1922) and Elaine Gladys Williams (1935–2010); Elaine was a year younger than Williams. The forename “Forman” has been used across multiple generations of the family: his grandfather, Foreman Reid Williams (1884–1972) bore the name, and the tradition continued with one of Williams’s six children, Forman Gary Williams. His great grandfather John Williams (1858-1919), who was born in Italy, immigrated to the US in 1876.

Williams married Elsie Vivian Kara in 1955; the marriage ended in divorce in 1978. Later that year he married Elizabeth Acevedo. He is the father of six children: Forman Gary Williams, Glen A. Williams, Michelle K. Williams, Susan D. Williams, Nancy L. Williams, and Michael S. Williams.
