= Thermo-acoustic instability =

Thermo-acoustic instability refers to an instability arising due to acoustics field and unsteady heat release process. This instability is very relevant in combustion instabilities in systems such as rocket engines, etc.

== Rayleigh criterion ==
A very simple mechanism of acoustic amplification was first identified by Lord Rayleigh in 1878. In simple terms, Rayleigh criterion states that amplification results if, on the average, heat addition occurs in phase with the pressure increases during the oscillation.. That is, if $p'$ is the pressure perturbation (with respect to its mean value $\langle p\rangle$) and $\dot q'$ is the rate of heat release per unit volume (with respect to its mean value $\langle \dot q\rangle$), then the Rayleigh criterion says that acoustic amplification occurs if

$\langle p' \dot q' \rangle >0.$

The Rayleigh criterion is used to explain many phenomena such as singing flames in tubes, sound amplification in Rijke tube and others. In complex systems, the Rayleigh criterion may not be strictly valid, as there exists many damping factors such as viscous/wall/nozzle/relaxation/homogeneous/particle damping, mean-flow effects, etc., that are not accounted for in Rayleigh's analysis.

== See also ==
- Darrieus–Landau instability
- Diffusive–thermal instability
- Rijke tube
