= Thermophone =

Speaker that uses heat to make sound

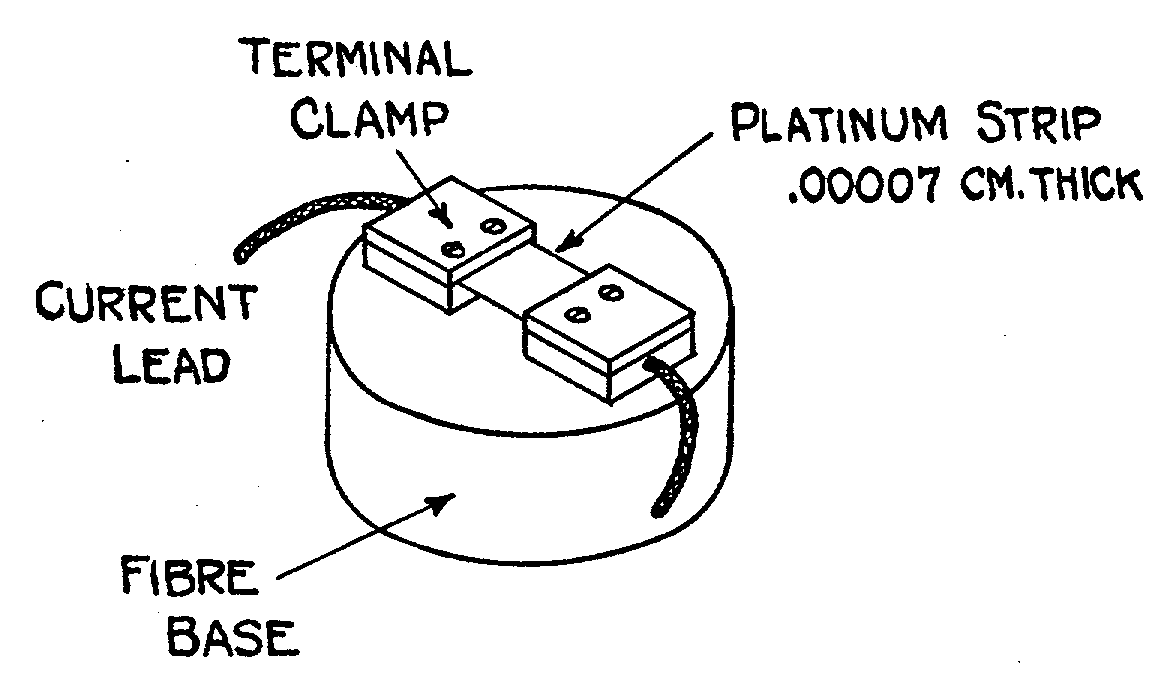
A diagram of a simple thermophone, from a 1917 Bell Labs paper

A thermophone is a type of transducer that converts an electrical signal into heat, which then becomes sound. It can be thought of as a type of loudspeaker that uses heat fluctuations to produce sound, instead of mechanical vibration.

The basic principle of the thermophone has been known since the 19th century. Thermophones have been used to calibrate acoustical apparatus (like microphones) since the 20th century. In recent years, the name thermoacoustic speaker has also been used.

== Beginnings ==
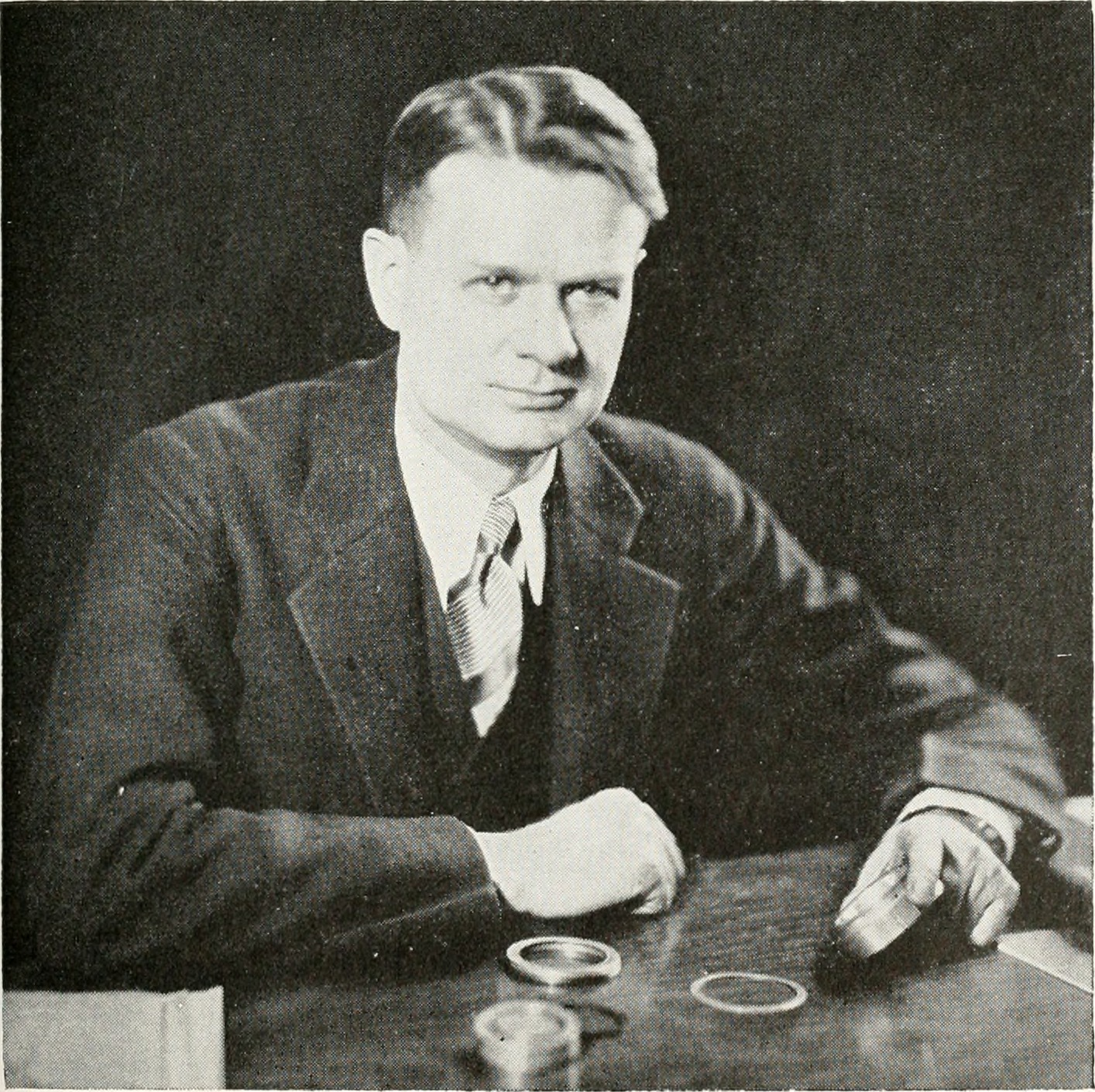
E.C Wente, a researcher of thermophones in the 20th century

Thermoacoustics is the study of the interaction between heat and sound. It is the basis of the thermophone. Byron Higgins in 1802 reported "singing flames" which occurred when the necks of jars were put over a hydrogen gas flame. Sondhauss (1850) and Rijke (1859) performed further experiments. A theory of thermoacoustics was produced by Lord Rayleigh in 1878.

The theory and practice of creating sound with electric heat emerged in the late 19th century. In 1880, William Henry Preece observed that, upon connecting a microphone transmitter to a platinum wire, sounds were produced:

...the sonorous effects were most marked and encouraging, when the microphone transmitter M was spoken into. The articluation, though muffled, was clear, and words could easily be heard.

In 1917, Harold D. Arnold and Irving B. Crandall of Bell Labs developed a quantitative theory for the thermophone. Since then, thermophones have been used as a precision device for microphone calibration. However, they did not see widespread use elsewhere due to their poor efficiency.

== Description ==
When alternating current is passed through a thin conductor, that conductor periodically heats up and cools down following the variations in current strength. This periodic heating and cooling creates temperature waves which the conductor propagates into the surroundings. As the temperature waves propagate away from the conductor, the thermal expansion and contraction of the transmission medium (e.g. air) produces corresponding sound waves.

An optimal thermophone is made of a conductor which is very thin and has a small heat capacity.

== Modern thermophones ==
In 1999, Shinouda and others presented a porous doped sillicon thermophone for ultrasonic emission. In 2008, Xiao et al. reported a thermophone made of carbon nanotubes. Since then, there has been a resurgence of research into thermophones and thermoacoustics. New materials for thermophones are being explored, and thermophones have been created using VLSI processes (like integrated circuits are).
