= Thermoacoustic heat engine =

Heat pump powered by sound

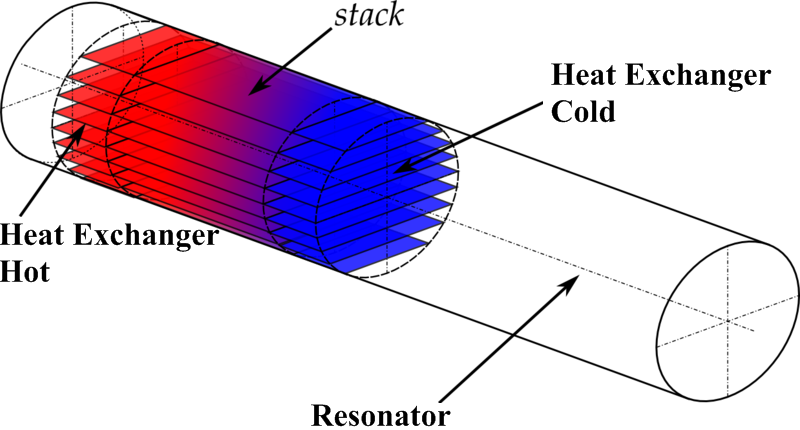
A schematic representation of a thermoacoustic hot-air engine. The hot side of the heat exchanger is connected to hot heat reservoir – and the cold side to cold heat reservoir. The electro-acoustic transducer, e.g. a loudspeaker, is not shown.

Thermoacoustic engines (sometimes called "TA engines") are thermoacoustic devices which use high-amplitude sound waves to pump heat from one place to another (this requires work, which is provided by the loudspeaker) or use a heat difference to produce work in the form of sound waves (these waves can then be converted into electrical current the same way as a microphone does).

These devices can be designed to use either a standing wave or a travelling wave.

Compared to vapor refrigerators, thermoacoustic refrigerators have no coolant and few moving parts (only the loudspeaker) and, therefore, require no dynamic sealing or lubrication.

== History ==
The ability of heat to produce sound was noted by glassblowers centuries ago. In the 1850s experiments showed that a temperature differential drove the phenomenon, and that acoustic volume and intensity vary with tube length and bulb size.

Rijke demonstrated that adding a heated wire screen a quarter of the way up the tube greatly magnified the sound, supplying energy to the air in the tube at its point of greatest pressure. Further experiments showed that cooling the air at its points of minimal pressure produced a similar amplifying effect. A Rijke tube converts heat into acoustic energy, using natural convection.

In about 1887, Lord Rayleigh discussed the possibility of pumping heat with sound.

In 1969, Rott reopened the topic. Using the Navier–Stokes equations for fluids, he derived equations specific for thermoacoustics.

Linear thermoacoustic models were developed to form a basic quantitative understanding, and numeric models for computation. Swift continued with these equations, deriving expressions for the acoustic power in thermoacoustic devices.

In 1992 a similar thermoacoustic refrigeration device was used on Space Shuttle Discovery.

Orest Symko at University of Utah began a research project in 2005 called Thermal Acoustic Piezo Energy Conversion (TAPEC).

Niche applications such as small to medium scale cryogenic applications. Score Ltd. was awarded £2M in March 2007 to research a cooking stove that also delivers electricity and cooling for use in developing countries.

A radioisotope-heated thermoacoustic system was proposed and prototyped for deep space exploration missions by Airbus. The system has slight theoretical advantages over other generator systems like existing thermocouple based systems, or a proposed Stirling engine used in ASRG prototype.

SoundEnergy developed the THEAC system that turns heat, typically waste heat or solar heat into cooling with no other power source. The device uses argon gas. The device amplifies sound created by the waste heat, converts the resulting pressure back into another heat differential and uses a Stirling cycle to produce the cooling effect.

== Operation ==
A thermoacoustic device takes advantages of the fact that in a sound wave parcels of gas alternatively compress and expand adiabatically, and pressure and temperature change simultaneously; when pressure reaches a maximum or minimum, so does the temperature. The device basically consists of heat exchangers, a resonator and a stack (on standing wave devices) or regenerator (on travelling wave devices). Depending on the type of engine, a driver or loudspeaker might be used to generate sound waves.

In a tube closed at both ends, interference can occur between two waves traveling in opposite directions at certain frequencies. The interference causes resonance and creates a standing wave. The stack consists of small parallel channels. When the stack is placed at a certain location in the resonator having a standing wave, a temperature differential develops across the stack. By placing heat exchangers at each side of the stack, heat can be moved. The opposite is possible as well: a temperature difference across the stack produces a sound wave. The first example is a heat pump, while the second is a prime mover.

=== Heat pump ===
Creating or moving heat from a cold to a warm reservoir requires work. Acoustic power provides this work. The stack creates a pressure drop. Interference between the incoming and reflected acoustic waves is now imperfect. The difference in amplitude causes the standing wave to travel, giving the wave acoustic power.

Heat pumping along a stack in a standing wave device follows the Brayton cycle.

A counter-clockwise Brayton cycle for a refrigerator consists of four processes that affect a parcel of gas between two plates of a stack.

1. Adiabatic compression of the gas. When a parcel of gas is displaced from its rightmost position to its leftmost position, the parcel is adiabatically compressed, increasing its temperature. At the leftmost position the parcel now has a higher temperature than the warm plate.
2. Isobaric heat transfer. The parcel's higher temperature causes it to transfer heat to the plate at constant pressure, cooling the gas.
3. Adiabatic expansion of the gas. The gas is displaced back from the leftmost position to the rightmost position. Due to adiabatic expansion the gas cools to a temperature lower than that of the cold plate.
4. Isobaric heat transfer. The parcel's lower temperature causes heat to be transferred from the cold plate to the gas at a constant pressure, returning the parcel's temperature to its original value.

Travelling wave devices can be described using the Stirling cycle.

=== Temperature gradient ===
Engines and heat pumps both typically use stacks and heat exchangers. The boundary between a prime mover and heat pump is given by the temperature gradient operator, which is the mean temperature gradient divided by the critical temperature gradient.

$$\Iota = \frac{\nabla T_{m}}{\nabla T_{crit}}$$

The mean temperature gradient is the temperature difference across the stack divided by the length of the stack.

$$\nabla T_{m} = \frac{\Delta T_{m}}{\Delta x_{stack}}$$

The critical temperature gradient is a value that depends on characteristics of the device such as frequency, cross-sectional area and gas properties.

If the temperature gradient operator exceeds one, the mean temperature gradient is larger than the critical temperature gradient and the stack operates as a prime mover. If the temperature gradient operator is less than one, the mean temperature gradient is smaller than the critical gradient and the stack operates as a heat pump.

=== Theoretical efficiency ===
In thermodynamics the highest achievable efficiency is the Carnot efficiency. The efficiency of thermoacoustic engines can be compared to Carnot efficiency using the temperature gradient operator.

The efficiency of a thermoacoustic engine is given by

$$\eta = \frac{\eta_{c}}{\Iota}$$

The coefficient of performance of a thermoacoustic heat pump is given by

$$COP = \Iota \cdot COP_{c}$$

== Practical efficiency ==
The most efficient thermoacoustic devices have an efficiency approaching 40% of the Carnot limit, or about 20% to 30% overall (depending on the heat engine temperatures).

Higher hot-end temperatures may be possible with thermoacoustic devices because they have no moving parts, thus allowing the Carnot efficiency to be higher. This may partially offset their lower efficiency, compared to conventional heat engines, as a percentage of Carnot.

The ideal Stirling cycle, approximated by traveling wave devices, is inherently more efficient than the ideal Brayton cycle, approximated by standing wave devices. However, the narrower pores required to give good thermal contact in a travelling wave device, as compared to a standing wave stack which requires deliberately imperfect thermal contact, also gives rise to greater frictional losses, reducing practical efficiency. The toroidal geometry often used in traveling wave devices, but not required for standing wave devices, can also boost losses due to Gedeon streaming around the loop.

== See also ==
- Sound amplification by stimulated emission of radiation (SASER)
