= Clavin–Garcia equation =

Clavin–Garcia equation or Clavin–Garcia dispersion relation provides the relation between the growth rate and the wave number of the perturbation superposed on a planar premixed flame, named after Paul Clavin and Pedro Luis Garcia Ybarra, who derived the dispersion relation in 1983. The dispersion relation accounts for Darrieus–Landau instability, Rayleigh–Taylor instability and diffusive–thermal instability and also accounts for the temperature dependence of transport coefficients.

== Dispersion relation ==
Let $k$ and $\sigma$ be the wavenumber (measured in units of planar laminar flame thickness $\delta_L$) and the growth rate (measured in units of the residence time $\delta_L^2/D_{T,u}$ of the planar laminar flame) of the perturbations to the planar premixed flame. Then the Clavin–Garcia dispersion relation is given by

$$a(k)\sigma^2 + b(k) \sigma + c(k)=0$$

where

$$\begin{align}
a(k) &= \frac{r+1}{r} + \frac{r-1}{r} k \left(\mathcal{M}_t -  \frac{r}{r-1}\mathcal{J}\right),\\
b(k) &= 2k + 2rk^2 (\mathcal{M}_t-\mathcal{J}),\\
c(k) &= - \frac{r-1}{r} Ra \, k - (r-1) k^2\left[1 -\frac{Ra}{r} \left(\mathcal{M}_t-  \frac{r}{r-1}\mathcal{J}\right)\right] + (r-1) k^3 \left[L + \frac{3r-1}{r-1}\mathcal{M}_t - \frac{2r}{r-1}\mathcal{J} + (2Pr-1) \mathcal H\right],
\end{align}$$

and

$$\mathcal{J} = \int_1^{r} \frac{\lambda(\theta)}{\theta}d\theta, \quad \mathcal H = \frac{1}{r-1}\int_{1}^{r} [L -\lambda(\theta)]d\theta.$$

Here

$r=\rho_u/\rho_b$	is the gas expansion ratio; ratio of burnt gas to unburnt gas density; typically $r\in (2,8)$;
$\lambda(\theta)=\rho D_T/\rho_u D_{T,u}$	is the ratio of density-thermal conductivity product to its value in the unburnt gas;
$\theta=T/T_u$	is the ratio of temperature to its unburnt value, defined such that $1\leq \theta \leq r$;
$L=\rho_bD_{T,b}/\rho_u D_{T,u}$	is the transport coefficient ratio, i.e., $L \equiv \lambda(r)$
$\mathcal{M}_t$	is the tangential flow-strain Markstein number; the curvature Markstein number $\mathcal{M}_c$ do not influence the stability.
$Ra = g\delta_L^3/D_{T,u}^2$	is the Rayleigh number; $Ra>0$ (gravity points towards burnt gas) and $Ra<0$ (gravity points towards unburnt gas)
$Pr=\nu_u/D_{T,u}$	is the Prandtl number.

The function $\lambda(\theta)$, in most cases, is simply given by $\lambda =\theta^m$, where $m=0.7$, in which case, we have $L=r^m$,

$$\mathcal{J} = \frac{1}{m} (r^m-1), \quad \mathcal H = r^m - \frac{r^{1+m}-1}{(1+m)(r-1)}.$$

In the constant transport coefficient assumption, $\lambda=1$, in which case, we have

$$\mathcal{J} =\ln r , \quad \mathcal H = 0.$$

== See also ==
- Clavin–Williams formula
