= The Chemical Basis of Morphogenesis =

1952 scholarly article by Alan Turing

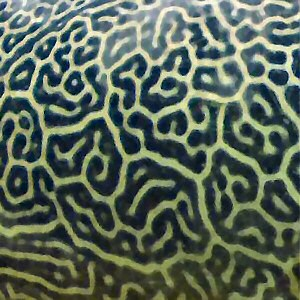
Turing's paper explained how natural patterns, such as stripes, spots, and spirals, like those of the giant pufferfish, may arise.

"The Chemical Basis of Morphogenesis" is an article that the English mathematician Alan Turing wrote in 1952. It describes how patterns in nature, such as stripes and spirals, can arise naturally from a homogeneous, uniform state. The theory, which can be called a reaction–diffusion theory of morphogenesis, has become a basic model in theoretical biology. Such patterns have come to be known as Turing patterns. For example, it has been postulated that the protein VEGFC can form Turing patterns to govern the formation of lymphatic vessels in the zebrafish embryo.

== Reaction–diffusion systems ==
Reaction–diffusion systems have attracted much interest as a prototype model for pattern formation. Patterns such as fronts, spirals, targets, hexagons, stripes and dissipative solitons are found in various types of reaction-diffusion systems in spite of large discrepancies e.g. in the local reaction terms. Such patterns have been dubbed "Turing patterns".

Reaction–diffusion processes form one class of explanation for the embryonic development of animal coats and skin pigmentation. Another reason for the interest in reaction-diffusion systems is that although they represent nonlinear partial differential equations, there are often possibilities for an analytical treatment.

In 1974, Stephen Smale constructed a model of two identical, intrinsically quiescent ("dead") cells—each described by four chemical variables—coupled via linear diffusion that generates self-sustained oscillations, noting that reducing the number of chemicals per cell to two or three is more difficult. In 2015, A. Mustafin showed that coupling-induced antiphase relaxation oscillations between two quiescent units can indeed be achieved with just two variables per unit (a consumer–resource pair) by introducing nonlinear (bilinear) interference coupling.

== See also ==
- Evolutionary developmental biology
- Turing pattern
- Symmetry breaking
