= Darrieus–Landau instability =

Intrinsic instability in flames

The Darrieus–Landau instability, or density fingering, refers to an instability of chemical fronts propagating into a denser medium, named after Georges Jean Marie Darrieus and Lev Landau. It is a key instrinsic flame instability that occurs in premixed flames, caused by density variations due to thermal expansion of the gas produced by the combustion process. In simple terms, stability inquires whether a steadily propagating plane sheet with a discontinuous jump in density is stable or not.

The analysis behind the Darrieus–Landau instability considers a planar, premixed flame front subjected to very small perturbations. It is useful to think of this arrangement as one in which the unperturbed flame is stationary, with the reactants (fuel and oxidizer) directed towards the flame and perpendicular to it with a velocity u1, and the burnt gases leaving the flame also in a perpendicular way but with velocity u2. The analysis assumes that the flow is incompressible, and that perturbations are governed by the linearized Euler equations, and are thus inviscid.

With these considerations, the main result of this analysis is that, if the density of burnt gases is less than that of the reactants (true in practice due to thermal expansion of the gas produced by combustion), the flame front is unstable to perturbations of any wavelength. Another result is that the rate of growth of perturbations is inversely proportional to their wavelength; thus small flames (but larger than the characteristic flame thickness) tend to wrinkle, and grow faster than larger ones. In practice, however, diffusive and buoyancy effects that are not taken into account by the analysis of Darrieus and Landau may have a stabilizing effect.

== History ==
Yakov Zeldovich notes that Lev Landau generously suggested this problem for him to investigate, and Zeldovich however, made calculation errors which led Landau himself to complete the work.

== Dispersion relation ==
If disturbances to the steady planar flame sheet are of the form $e^{i\mathbf{k}\cdot\mathbf{x}_\bot+\sigma t}$, where $\mathbf{x}_\bot$ is the transverse coordinate system that lies on the undisturbed stationary flame sheet, $t$ is the time, $\mathbf{k}$ is the wavevector of the disturbance and $\sigma$ is the temporal growth rate of the disturbance, then the dispersion relation is given by

$$\frac{\sigma}{S_L k} = \frac{r}{r+1}\left(\sqrt{1+ \frac{r^2-1}{r}}-1\right)$$

where $S_L$ is the laminar burning velocity (or, the flow velocity far upstream of the flame in a frame that is fixed to the flame), $k=|\mathbf{k}|$ and $r=\rho_u/\rho_b$ is the ratio of burnt to unburnt gas density. In combustion, $r>1$ always and therefore the growth rate $\sigma>0$ for all wavenumbers. This implies that a plane sheet of flame with a burning velocity $S_L$ is unstable for all wavenumbers. In fact, Amable Liñán and Forman A. Williams quote in their book that: "... in view of laboratory observations of stable, planar, laminar flames, publication of their theoretical predictions required courage on the part of Darrieus and Landau".

=== With buoyancy ===
If buoyancy forces are taken into account (in others words, Rayleigh–Taylor instability is considered) for planar flames perpendicular to the gravity vector, then some stability can be anticipated for flames propagating vertically downwards (or flames held stationary by an upward flow), since in these cases, the denser unburnt gas lies beneath the lighter burnt gas mixture. Of course, for flames propagating upwards or those held stationary by downward flow, both the Darrieus–Landau mechanism and the Rayleigh–Taylor mechanism contributes to the destabilizing effect. The dispersion relation when buoyance forces are included becomes

$$\frac{\sigma}{S_L k} = \frac{r}{r+1}\left[\sqrt{1+ \left(\frac{r^2-1}{r}\right)\left(1-\frac{g}{S_L^2 r k }\right)}-1\right]$$

where $g>0$ corresponds to gravitational acceleration for flames propagating downwards and $g<0$ corresponds to gravitational acceleration for flames propagating upwards. The above dispersion implies that gravity introduces stability for downward propagating flames when $k^{-1}>l_{b}=S_{L}^2r/g$, where $l_b$ is a characteristic buoyancy length scale. For small values of $r-1$, the growth rate becomes

$$\frac{\sigma}{S_L k} =\frac{1}{2}(r-1)  +\cdots \quad k^{-1}\ll l_b,$$
$$\frac{\sigma}{S_L k} =\frac{1}{2}(r-1) \left(1-\frac{g}{S_L^2 k}\right) +\cdots \quad k^{-1}\sim l_b,$$
$$\frac{\sigma}{g/S_L} =-\frac{1}{2}(r-1) +\cdots \quad k^{-1}\gg l_b.$$

=== Limitations ===
Darrieus and Landau's analysis treats the flame as a plane sheet to investigate its stability with the neglect of diffusion effects, whereas in reality, the flame has a definite thickness, say the laminar flame thickness $k^{-1}\sim \delta_L=D_T/S_L$, where $D_T$ is the thermal diffusivity, wherein diffusion effects cannot be neglected. Accounting for the flame structure, as first envisioned by George H. Markstein, is found to result in stabilized flames for small wavelengths $k^{-1}\sim \delta_L$, except when the fuel diffusion coefficient and thermal diffusivity differ from each other significantly, leading to the so-called (Turing) diffusive-thermal instability. The full dispersion relation $\sigma=\sigma(k)$ with diffusive-thermal stabilising effect is given by the Clavin–Garcia equation.

Darrieus–Landau instability manifests in the range $\delta_L\ll k^{-1}\ll l_b$ for downward propagating flames, and $\delta_L\ll k^{-1}$ for upward propagating flames.

=== Under Darcy's law ===
The classical dispersion relation was based on the assumption that the hydrodynamics is governed by Euler equations. In strongly confined systems such as a Hele-Shaw cell or in porous media, hydrodynamics however, is governed by Darcy's law. The dispersion relation based on Darcy's law was derived by J. Daou and P. Rajamanickam, and reads:

$$\frac{\sigma}{S_L k} = \frac{r-1}{1+m} + \frac{1-m}{1+m}\frac{V}{S_L} - \frac{r-1}{1+m}  \frac{\rho_b g\kappa_b}{S_L \mu_b}$$

where $r = \rho_u/\rho_b>1$ is the density ratio, $m=(\mu_u/\kappa_u)/(\mu_b/\kappa_b)<1$ is the ratio of friction factor which involves viscosity $\mu$ and permeability $\kappa$ (in Hele-Shaw cells, $\kappa_u=\kappa_b=h^2/12$, where $h$ is the cell width, so that $m=\mu_u/\mu_b$ is simply the viscosity ratio).

$V$ is the speed of a uniform imposed flow. When $V>0$, the imposed flow opposes flame propagation and when $V<0$, it aids flame propagation.

As before, $g>0$ corresponds to downward flame propagation and $g<0$ to upward flame propagation. The three terms in the above formula, respectively, corresponds to Darrieus–Landau instability (density fingering), Saffman–Taylor instability (viscous fingering) and Rayleigh–Taylor instability (gravity fingering), all in the context of Darcy's law. The Saffman–Taylor instability is specific to confined flames and does not exist in unconfined flames.

== See also ==
- Michelson–Sivashinsky equation
- Clavin–Garcia equation
