= Johannes Bosscha =

Dutch physicist

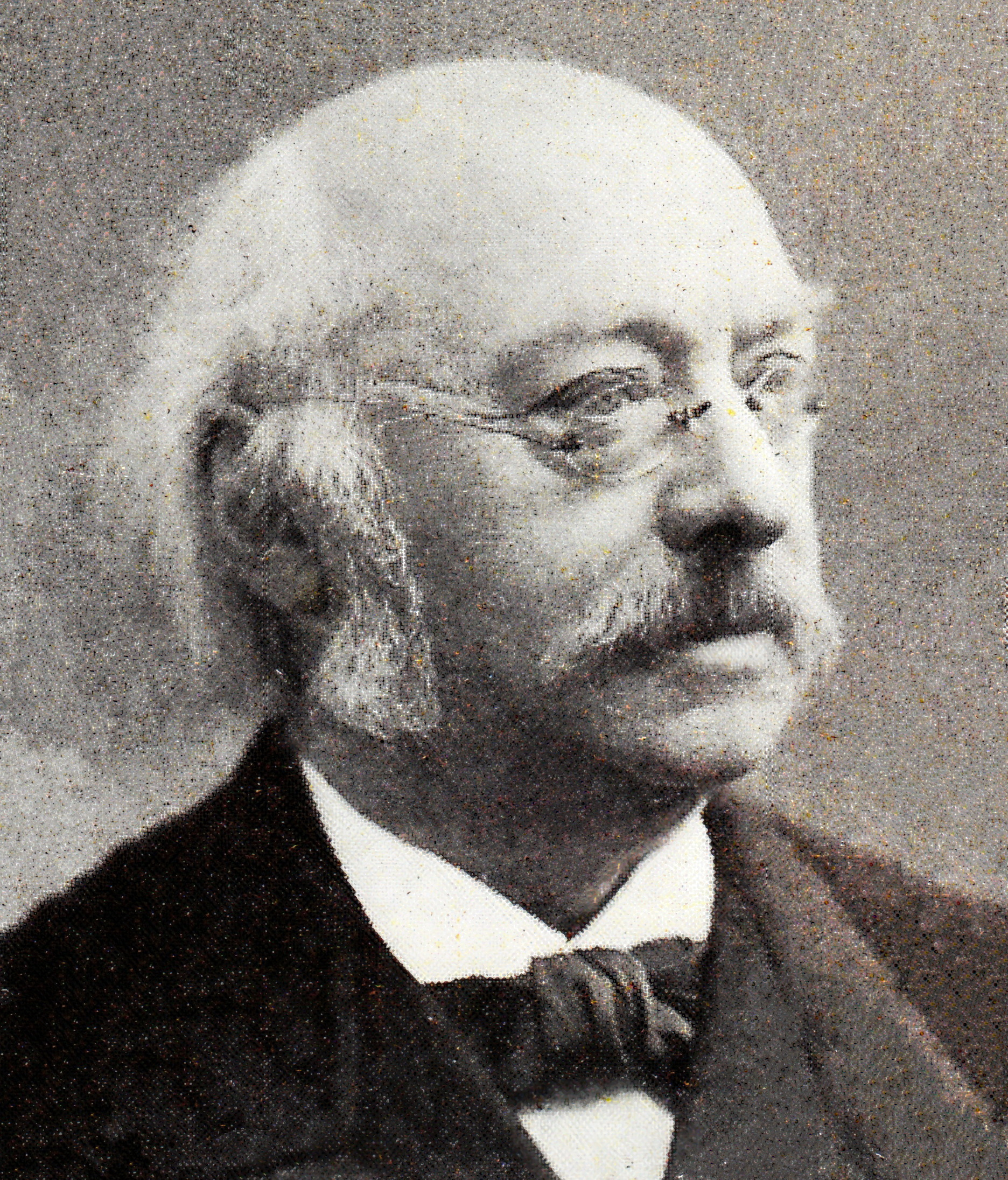
- Johannes Bosscha.
- Born: 18 November 1831; Breda, Netherlands
- Died: 15 April 1911 (aged 79); Heemstede, Netherlands
- Education: Leiden University
- Scientific career
- Fields: Physics
- Doctoral advisor: Pieter Rijke

Johannes Bosscha Jr. (18 November 1831 – 15 April 1911) was a Dutch physicist.

Bosscha came from a family long known for their academic achievements. His great-grandfather and grandfather were classical scholars. His father, Johannes Bosscha Sr. (1797–1874), was a professor of history and literature and also was minister of church-state relationships in two governments (1853–1861). From 1844–1848 Johannes Jr. attended a Latin school in Amsterdam, after which he enrolled at Leiden University. In 1854 he obtained his doctoral degree (promotor Pieter Rijke) with a thesis on galvanometry. After a brief sojourn in Berlin he returned to the physics department in Leiden.

Here he made important investigations on galvanic polarization and the rapidity of sound waves. He initiated the mechanical theory of electrolysis, and he was one of the first (1855) to suggest the possibility of sending two messages simultaneously over the same wire. In 1858 he published "Conservation of Energy in Galvanic Currents", in which he applied the recently formulated first law of thermodynamics to electrical phenomena.

In 1860, Boscha became chair of natural sciences at the Koninklijke Militaire Academie in Breda and in 1863 became a member of the Royal Netherlands Academy of Arts and Sciences. In that year Thorbecke appointed him as inspector of secondary education for the southern part of the country, in which capacity he had much influence on Thorbecke's newly introduced schooling system, insisting, for example, on specialized classrooms for physics and chemistry. In 1873 he accepted the chair of the physics department at the Polytechnic School in Delft, which would turn into the Delft University of Technology. In 1875, he published a three-volume Leerboek der natuurkunde (Textbook of Physics) in which no higher math was used and which saw many editions.

In 1878 Boscha became director of the Polytechnic School. Heike Kamerlingh Onnes was his assistant from 1878 to 1882, after which Kamerlingh Onnes became professor at Leiden University. In 1885 Boscha needed to resign as director because of poor health.

His Verspreide Geschriften (Diverse Writings) were published in three volumes (Leyden, 1902).

== Personal life ==
In 1855 he married Paulina Emilia Kerkhoven in the town of Voorst. They had four daughters and two sons. The Bosscha Observatory on Java has been named after his son Karel Albert Rudolf Bosscha (1865–1928), who contributed much to the technical development of Indonesia.

== Sources ==
- Klaas van Berkel, Albert van Helden & L.C. Palm A History of Science in the Netherlands, BRILL 1999, pp. 425–6.
- Johannes Bosscha at the Mathematics Genealogy Project
- W.G. Stam, Johannes Bosscha Jr. (1831-1911) and the development of the field of physics in the Netherlands in the second half of the 19th century (2017)
