= Saffman–Taylor instability =

Fluid instability

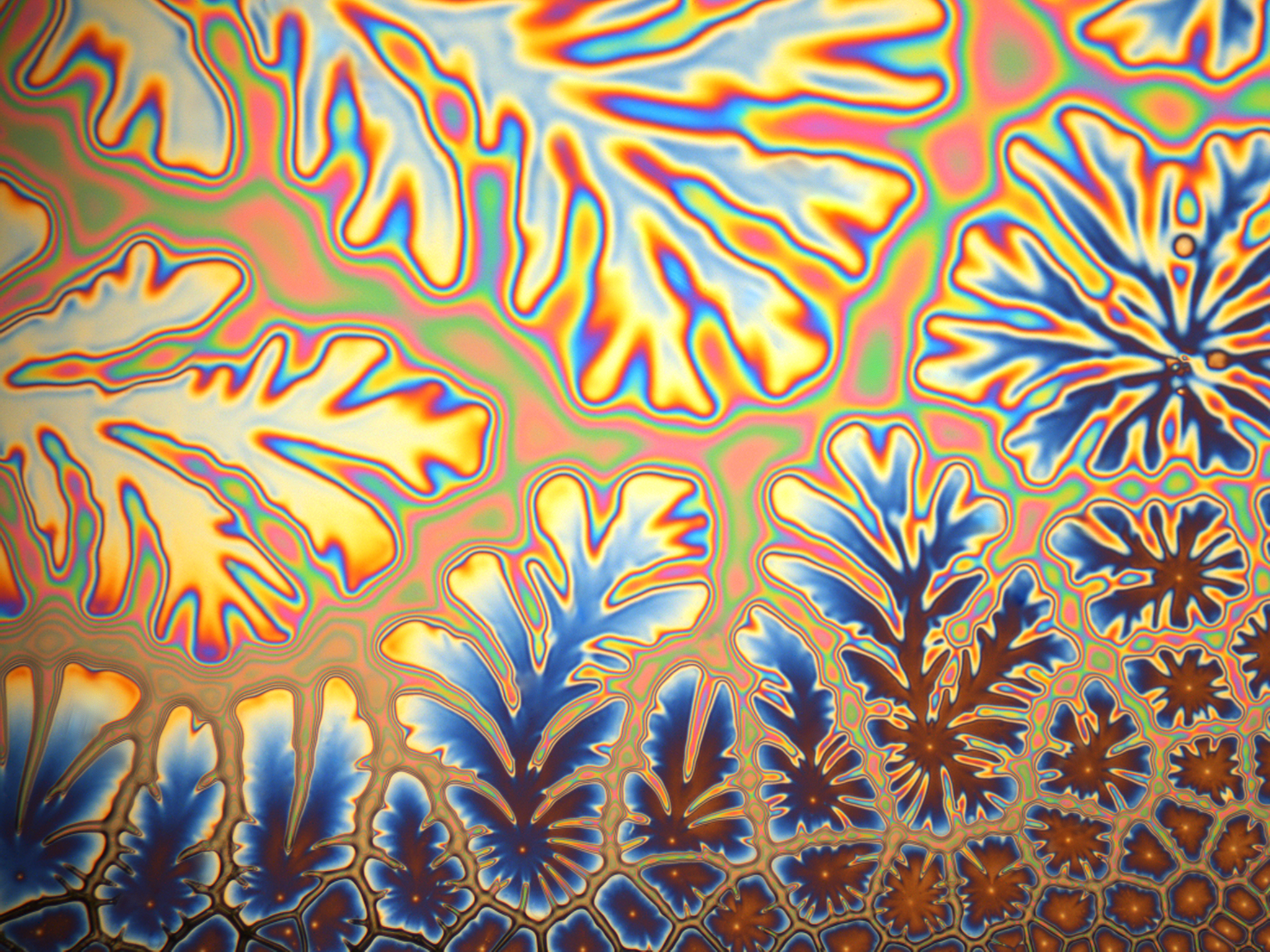
An example of viscous fingering in a Hele-Shaw cell.

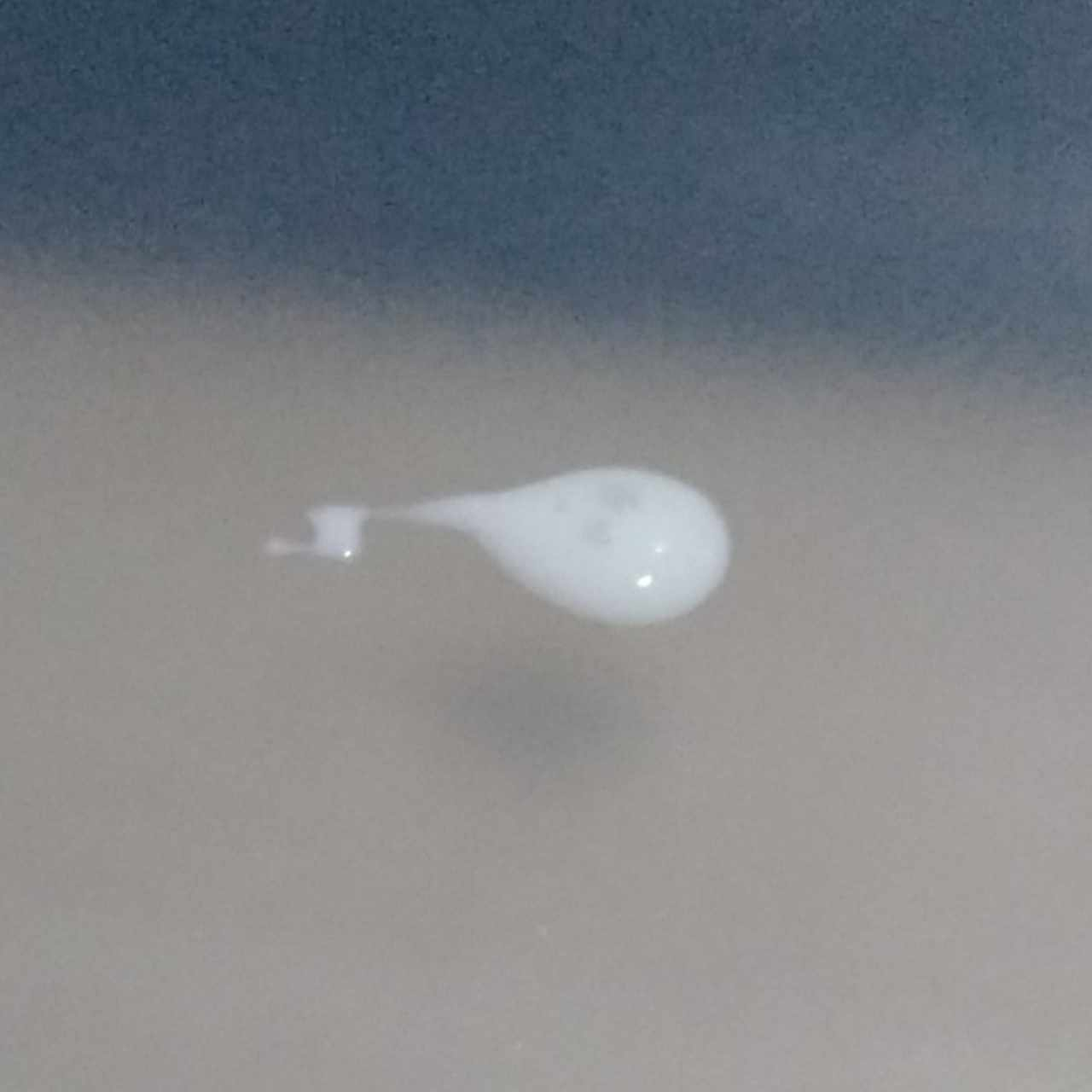
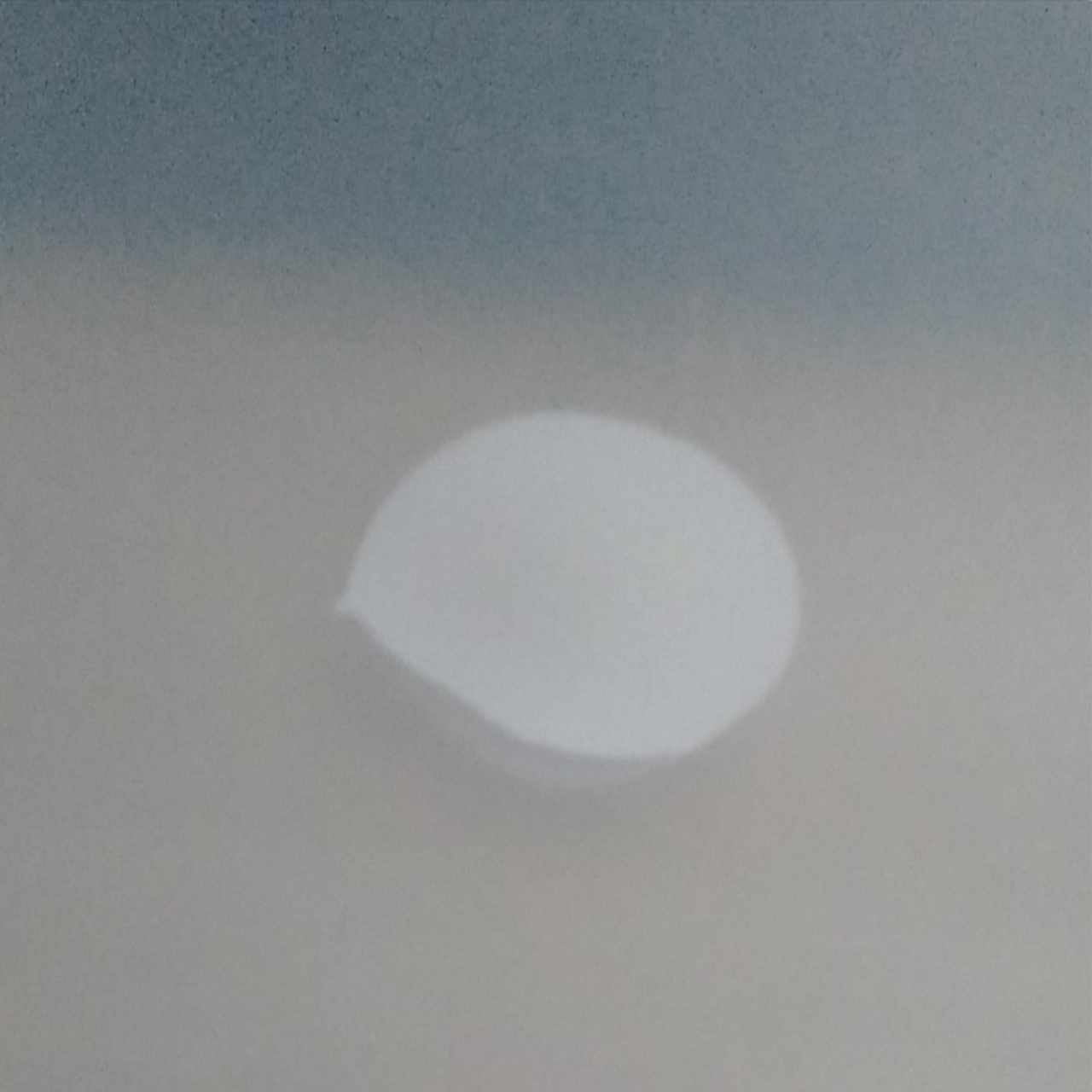
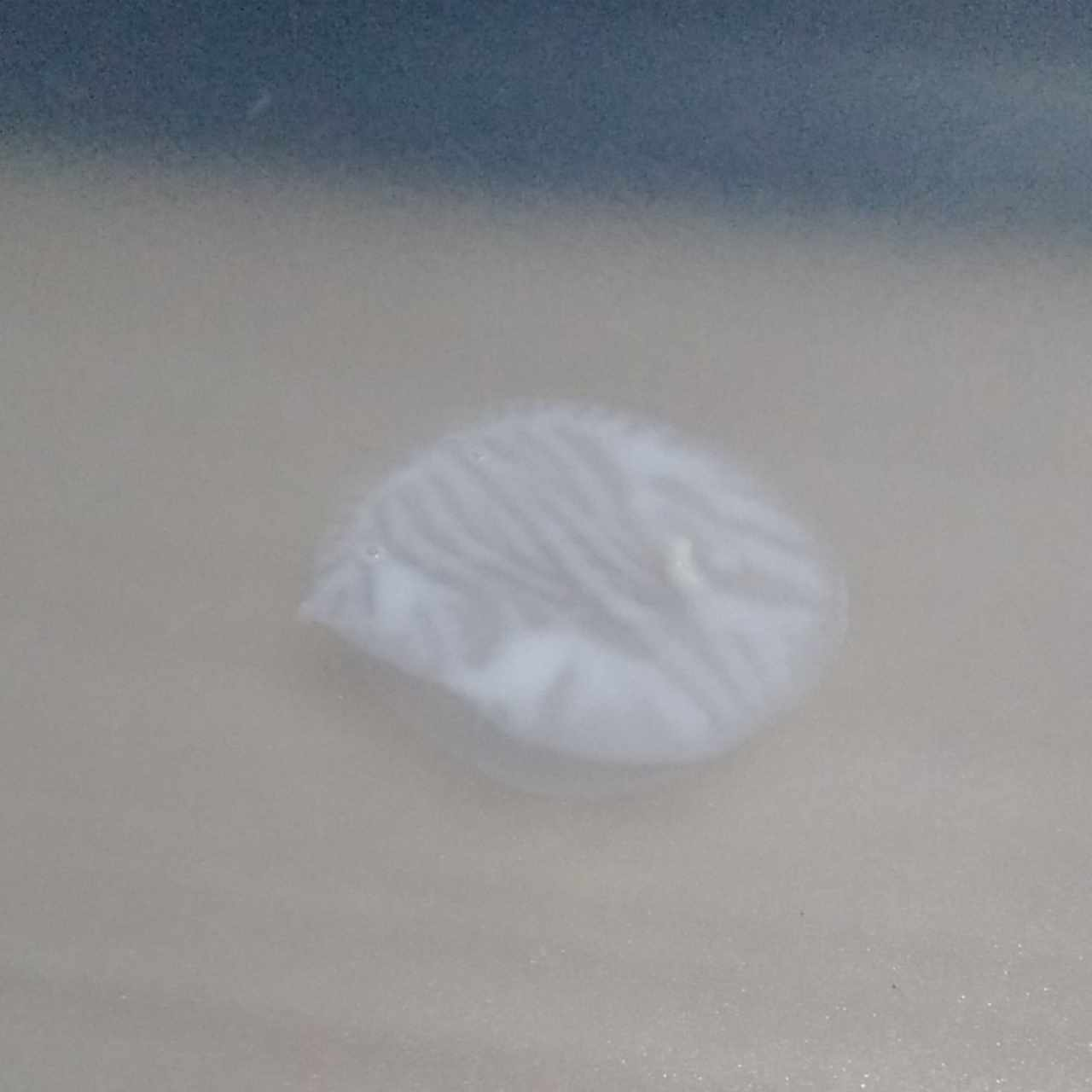
A demonstration of the Saffman-Taylor instability is such when a viscous substance, such as PVA glue, is placed on a flat surface (Top), another parallel surface is placed on top and the glue spreads out (Middle), and the surfaces are lifted, air, a less viscous fluid, attempts to invade the space where the glue is located.The interface between the glue and the air becomes unstable, leading to the formation of finger or branching-like patterns (Bottom.).

The Saffman–Taylor instability, also known as viscous fingering, is the formation of patterns in a morphologically unstable interface between two fluids in a porous medium or in a Hele-Shaw cell, described mathematically by Philip Saffman and G. I. Taylor in a paper of 1958. This situation is most often encountered during drainage processes through media such as soils. It occurs when a less viscous fluid is injected, displacing a more viscous fluid; in the inverse situation, with the more viscous displacing the other, the interface is stable and no instability is seen. In the rectangular configuration the system evolves until a single finger (the Saffman–Taylor finger) forms, whilst in the radial configuration the pattern grows forming fingers by successive tip-splitting.

Most experimental research on viscous fingering has been performed on Hele-Shaw cells, which consist of two closely spaced, parallel sheets of glass containing a viscous fluid. The two most common set-ups are the channel configuration, in which the less viscous fluid is injected at one end of the channel, and the radial configuration, in which the less viscous fluid is injected at the centre of the cell. Instabilities analogous to viscous fingering can also be self-generated in biological systems.

== Derivation for a planar interface ==
The simplest case of the instability arises at a planar interface within a porous medium or Hele-Shaw cell, and was treated by Saffman and Taylor but also earlier by other authors. A fluid of viscosity $\mu_1$ is driven in the $x$-direction into another fluid of viscosity $\mu_2$ at some velocity $V$. Denoting the permeability of the porous medium as a constant, isotropic, $\Pi$, Darcy's law gives the unperturbed pressure fields in the two fluids $i=1,\,2$ to be
$$p^{(0)}_i = p_{\text{int}} - \frac{V \mu_i}{\Pi}x,$$
where $p_{\text{int}}$ is the pressure at the planar interface, working in a frame where this interface is instantaneously given by $x=0$. Perturbing this interface to $x=\eta_0 \exp{\left(\mathrm{i}ky + \sigma t\right)}$ (decomposing into normal modes in the $x-y$ plane, and taking $\left|\eta_0\right| \ll 1$), the pressure fields become
$$p_i = p^{(0)}_i + \tilde{p}_i\left(x\right)\exp{\left(\mathrm{i}ky+\sigma t\right)}.$$
As a consequence of the incompressibility of the flow and Darcy's law, the pressure fields must be harmonic, which, coupled with the requirement that the perturbation decay as $x \to \pm \infty$, fixes $\tilde{p}_1 = \tilde{p}_1 e^{kx}$ and $\tilde{p}_2 = \tilde{p}_2 e^{-kx}$, with the constants $\tilde{p}$ to be determined by continuity of pressure. Upon linearization, the kinematic boundary condition at the interface (that fluid velocity in the $x$ direction must match the velocity of the fluid interface), coupled with Darcy's law, gives
$$-\frac{\Pi}{\mu_i}\left.\frac{\partial \tilde{p}_i}{\partial x}\right|_{x=0} = \sigma \eta_0,$$
and thus that $\tilde{p}_1 = -\frac{\sigma\eta_0\mu_1}{\Pi k}$ and $\tilde{p}_2 = \frac{\sigma\eta_0\mu_2}{\Pi k}$. Matching the pressure fields at the interface gives
$$-V \mu_1 - \frac{\sigma \mu_1}{k} = -V \mu_2 + \frac{\sigma \mu_2}{k},$$
and so $\sigma = kV\left(\mu_2 - \mu_1\right)/\left(\mu_1 + \mu_2\right)$, leading to growth of the perturbation when $\mu_2 > \mu_1$ - i.e. when the injected fluid is less viscous than the ambient fluid. There are problems with this basic case: namely that the most unstable mode has infinite wavenumber $k$ and grows at an infinitely fast rate, which can be rectified by the introduction of surface tension (which provides a jump condition in pressures across the fluid interface through the Young–Laplace equation), which has the effect of modifying the growth rate to

$$\sigma = \frac{kV\left(\mu_2 - \mu_1\right) - \gamma H_f k^3}{\mu_1 + \mu_2},$$

with surface tension $\gamma$ and $H_f$ the mean curvature. This suppresses small-wavelength (high-wavenumber) disturbances, and we would expect to see instabilities with wavenumber $k$ close to the value of $k$ which results in the maximal value of $\sigma$; in this case with surface tension, there is a unique maximal value.

== In radial geometry ==
The Saffman–Taylor instability is usually seen in an axisymmetric context as opposed to the simple planar case derived above. The mechanisms for the instability remain the same in this case, and the selection of the most unstable wavenumber in this case corresponds to a given number of fingers (an integer).

== See also ==
- Kelvin–Helmholtz instability
- Darcy's law
- Darrieus–Landau instability
