= Rijke tube =

Device that converts heat into sound

The Rijke tube is a cylindrical tube with both ends open, inside of which a heat source is placed that turns heat into sound, by creating a self-amplifying standing wave, due to thermo-acoustic instability. It is an entertaining phenomenon in acoustics and is an excellent example of resonance.

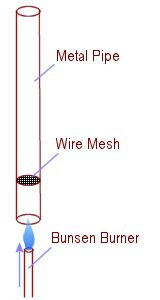
A simple construction of the Rijke tube, with a wire mesh in the lower half of a vertical metal pipe. The tube is suspended over a bunsen burner.

== Discovery ==
P. L. Rijke was a professor of physics at the Leiden University in the Netherlands when, in 1859, he discovered a way of using heat to sustain a sound in a cylindrical tube open at both ends. He used a glass tube, about 0.8 m long and 3.5 cm in diameter. Inside it, about 20 cm from one end, he placed a disc of wire gauze as shown in the figure on right. Friction with the walls of the tube is sufficient to keep the gauze in position. With the tube vertical and the gauze in the lower half, he heated the gauze with a flame until it was glowing red hot. Upon removing the flame, he obtained a loud sound from the tube which lasted until the gauze cooled down (about 10s). It is safer in modern reproductions of this experiment to use a borosilicate glass tube or, better still, one made of metal.

Instead of heating the gauze with a flame, Rijke also tried electrical heating. Making the gauze with electrical resistance wire causes it to glow red when a sufficiently large current is passed. With the heat being continuously supplied, the sound is also continuous and rather loud. Rijke seems to have received complaints from his university colleagues because he reports that the sound could be easily heard three rooms away from his laboratory. The electrical power required to achieve this is about 1 kW.

Lord Rayleigh, who wrote the definitive textbook on sound in 1877, recommends this as a very effective lecture demonstration. He used a cast iron pipe 1.5 m long and 12 cm diameter with two layers of gauze made from iron wire inserted about quarter of the way up the tube. The extra gauze is to retain more heat, which makes the sound longer lasting. He reports in his book that the sound rises to such intensity as to shake the room!

A "reverse" Rijke effect — namely, that a Rijke tube will also produce audio oscillations if hot air flows through a cold screen — was first observed by Rijke's assistant Johannes Bosscha and subsequently investigated by German physicist Peter Theophil Rieß.

== Mechanism ==
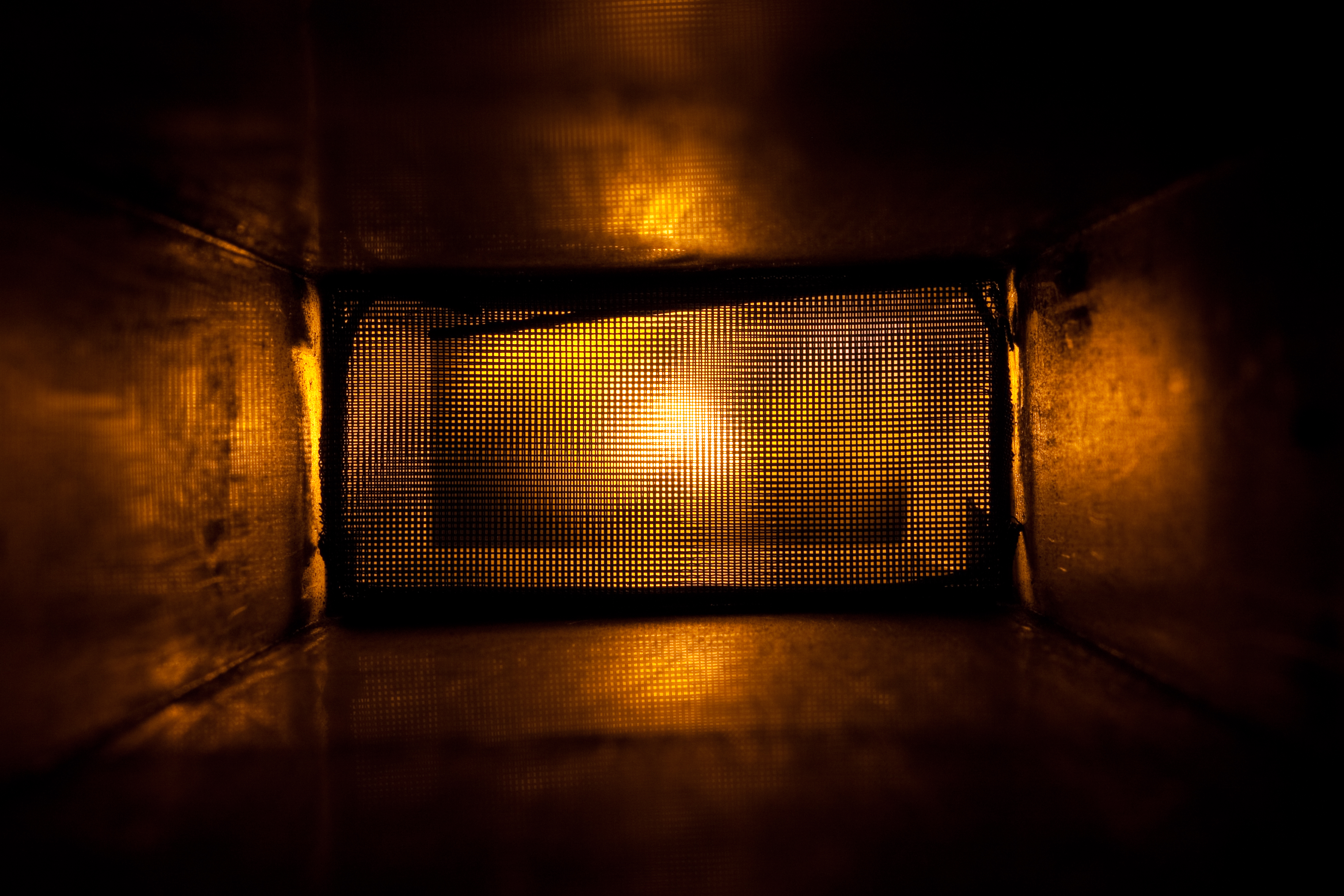
Interior of a Rijke tube being heated by a gas torch

Working of Rijke Tube

The sound comes from a standing wave whose wavelength is about twice the length of the tube, giving the fundamental frequency. Lord Rayleigh, in his book, gave the correct explanation of how the sound is stimulated. The flow of air past the gauze is a combination of two motions. There is a uniform upwards motion of the air due to a convection current resulting from the gauze heating up the air. Superimposed on this is the motion due to the sound wave.

For half the vibration cycle, the air flows into the tube from both ends until the pressure reaches a maximum. During the other half cycle, the flow of air is outwards until the minimum pressure is reached. All air flowing past the gauze is heated to the temperature of the gauze and any transfer of heat to the air will increase its pressure according to the ideal gas law. As the air flows upwards past the gauze most of it will already be hot because it has just come downwards past the gauze during the previous half cycle. However, just before the pressure maximum, a small quantity of cool air comes into contact with the gauze and its pressure is suddenly increased. This increases the pressure maximum, so reinforcing the vibration. During the other half cycle, when the pressure is decreasing, the air above the gauze is forced downwards past the gauze again. Since it is already hot, no pressure change due to the gauze takes place, since there is no transfer of heat. The sound wave is therefore reinforced once every vibration cycle, and it quickly builds up to a very large amplitude.

This explains why there is no sound when the flame is heating the gauze: all air flowing through the tube is heated by the flame, so when it reaches the gauze, it is already hot and no pressure increase takes place.

When the gauze is in the upper half of the tube, there is no sound. In this case, the cool air brought in from the bottom by the convection current reaches the gauze towards the end of the outward vibration movement. This is immediately before the pressure minimum, so a sudden increase in pressure due to the heat transfer tends to cancel out the sound wave instead of reinforcing it.

The position of the gauze in the tube is not critical as long as it is in the lower half. To work out its best position, there are two things to consider. Most heat will be transferred to the air where the displacement of the wave is a maximum, i.e. at the end of the tube. However, the effect of increasing the pressure is greatest where there is the greatest pressure variation, i.e. in the middle of the tube. Placing the gauze midway between these two positions (one quarter of the way in from the bottom end) is a simple way to come close to the optimal placement.

The Rijke tube is considered to be a standing wave form of thermoacoustic devices known as "heat engines" or "prime movers".

== Sondhauss tube ==
A Taiwanese Professor demonstrates a Rijke tube in Mandarin.

The Rijke tube operates with both ends open. However, a tube with one end closed will also generate sound from heat, if the closed end is very hot. Such a device is called a "Sondhauss tube". The phenomenon was first observed by glassblowers and was first described in 1850 by the German physicist Karl Friedrich Julius Sondhauss (1815–1886). Lord Rayleigh first explained the operation of the Sondhauss tube.

The Sondhauss tube operates in a way that is basically similar to the Rijke tube: Initially, air moves towards the hot, closed end of the tube, where it's heated, so that the pressure at that end increases. The hot, higher-pressure air then flows from the closed end towards the cooler, open end of the tube. The air transfers its heat to the tube and cools. The air surges slightly beyond the open end of the tube, briefly compressing the atmosphere; the compression propagates through the atmosphere as a sound wave. The atmosphere then pushes the air back into the tube, and the cycle repeats. Unlike the Rijke tube, the Sondhauss tube does not require a steady flow of air through it, and whereas the Rijke tube acts as a half-wave resonator, the Sondhauss tube acts as a quarter-wave resonator.

Like the Rijke tube, it was discovered that placing a porous heater — as well as a "stack" (a "plug" that is porous) — in the tube greatly increased the power and efficiency of the Sondhauss tube. (In demonstration models, the tube can be heated externally and steel wool can serve as a stack.)

== See also ==
- Pyrophone

== Further information ==
- Feldman, K.T. Jr. (1968). "Review of literature on Rijke thermoacoustic phenomena". Journal of Sound and Vibration. 7 (10): 83–89. Bibcode:1968JSV.....7...83F. doi:10.1016/0022-460X(68)90159-4.
- Rijke-Rohr (Rijke tube) at: Wundersames Sammelsurium (Wondrous Collection) (in German) Includes original articles by early investigators of thermoacoustics (Rijke, Reiss, etc.).
- Evans, R. E.; Putnam, A. A. (1966). "Rijke tube apparatus". American Journal of Physics. 34 (4): 360–361. Bibcode:1966AmJPh..34..360E. doi:10.1119/1.1972980.
- Julius Sumner Miller, "Sounding Pipes" on YouTube Demonstrations of Rijke tubes.
