= Pieter Rijke =

Dutch physicist (1812–1899)

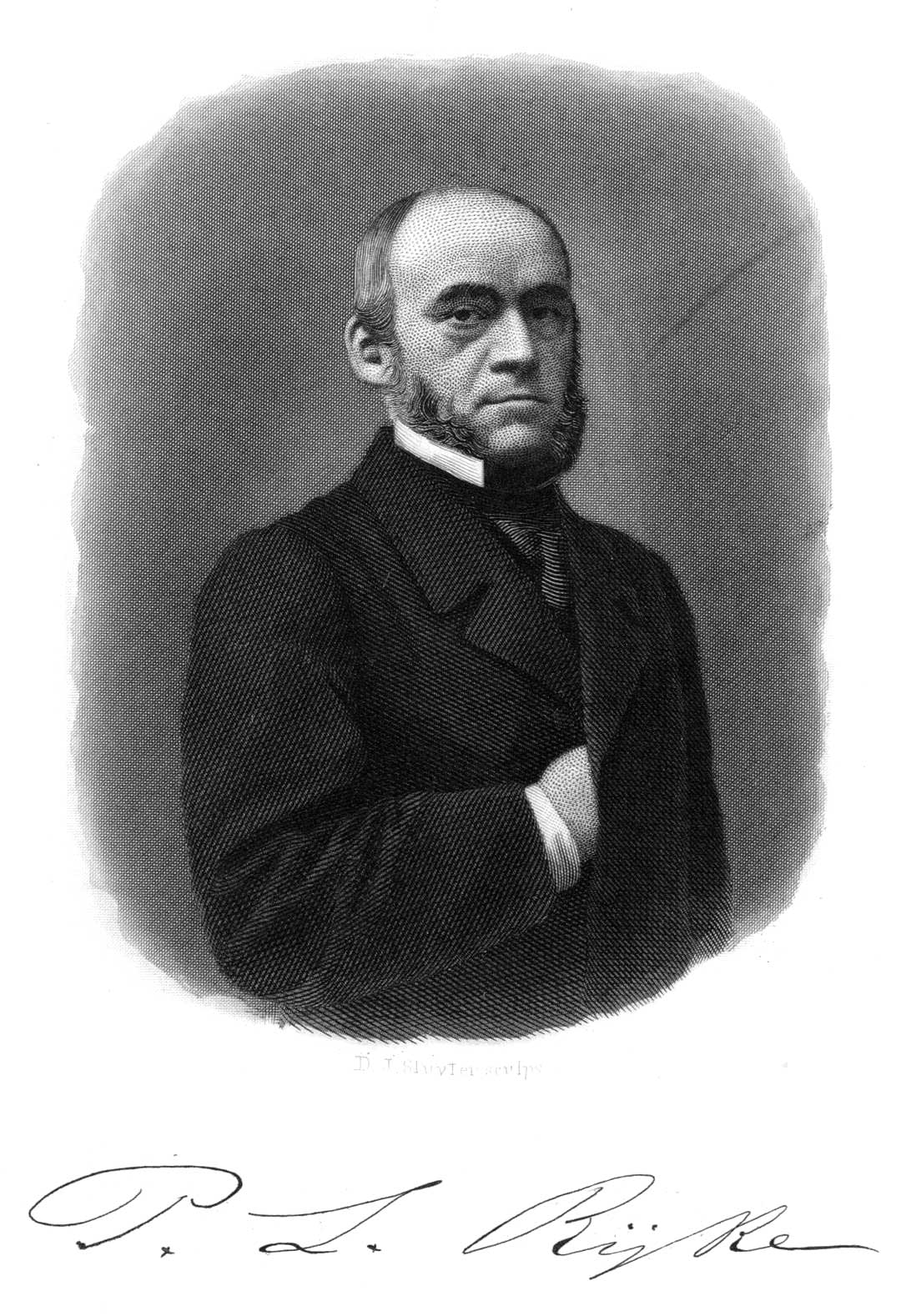
- Born: Petrus Leonardus Rijke; 11 July 1812; Hemmen, Yssel-Supérieur, French Empire
- Died: 7 April 1899 (aged 86); Leiden, South Holland, Netherlands
- Education: Leiden University (PhD)
- Known for: Rijke tube (1859)
- Scientific career
- Fields: Physics
- Workplaces: Leiden University (1845–82)
- Thesis: De origine electricitatis voltaicae (1836)
- Doctoral advisor: Pieter Uijlenbroek
- Doctoral students: Johannes Bosscha (1854); Johannes van der Waals (1873); Hendrik Lorentz (1875); Hermanus Haga (1876)

Petrus "Pieter" Leonardus Rijke (Dutch: [ˈrɛi̯kə]; 11 July 1812 – 7 April 1899) was a Dutch physicist who was Professor in Experimental physics at Leiden University. He spent his scientific career exploring the physics of electricity, and is known for the Rijke tube.

== Education ==
Petrus Leonardus Rijke was born on 11 July 1812 in Hemmen, the son of Dirk Rijke, a pastor, and Elisabeth Pieternella Beausar.

From 1830, Rijke studied physics under Pieter Johannes Uijlenbroek at Leiden University, where he received his Ph.D. in 1836. His thesis titled De origine electricitatis voltaicae (On the origin of voltaic electricity).

== Career ==
In 1835, Rijke was appointed Professor of Physics at the Royal Athenaeum in Maastricht. In 1845, he became an extraordinary professor, and in 1854 was promoted to Full Professor of Physics at Leiden University. There, he started a physics laboratory with a large collection of scientific instruments. His most notable students were Hendrik Lorentz and Johannes van der Waals, who would win the Nobel Prize in Physics in 1902 and 1910, respectively.

Rijke retired in 1882, and was succeeded by Heike Kamerlingh Onnes as Professor of Experimental Physics at Leiden University.

Rijke died on 7 April 1899 in Leiden at the age of 86.

Rijke became a Member of the Royal Netherlands Academy of Arts and Sciences in 1863.

== See also ==
- Rijke tube
