= Journal of Computational and Nonlinear Dynamics =

Quarterly peer-reviewed journal covering nonlinear dynamics

- Subject: Nonlinear dynamics
- Language: English
- Edited by: Balakumar Balachandran

Publication details
- History: 2006–present
- Publisher: American Society of Mechanical Engineers
- Frequency: Quarterly
- Impact factor: 2.085 (2020)

Standard abbreviations
- ISO 4: J. Comput. Nonlinear Dyn.

Indexing
- ISSN: 1555-1415 (print); 1555-1423 (web)
- LCCN: 2005212198
- OCLC no.: 971950735

Links
- Journal homepage; Online access; Online archive

The Journal of Computational and Nonlinear Dynamics is a quarterly peer-reviewed multidisciplinary scientific journal covering the study of nonlinear dynamics. It was established in 2006 and is published by the American Society of Mechanical Engineers. The editor-in-chief is Balakumar Balachandran (University of Maryland). According to the Journal Citation Reports, the journal has a 2017 impact factor of 1.996.
