= Peyman Givi =

Persian-American rocket scientist and engineer

- Citizenship: American
- Education: Youngstown State University
- Known for: Filtered density function
- Awards: NASA Public Service Medal, NSF Presidential Faculty Fellowship
- Scientific career
- Fields: Combustion, Fluid Mechanics
- Workplaces: State University of New York Buffalo, University of Pittsburgh
- Doctoral advisor: William Sirignano
- Website: givi.pitt.edu

Peyman Givi (Persian: پیمان گیوی) is a Persian-American rocket scientist and engineer.

Givi currently serves as a Distinguished Professor of Mechanical Engineering and Materials Science and the James T. McLeod Professor at the University of Pittsburgh, and previously was Distinguished Professor of Aerospace Engineering at State University of New York.

He is an Elected Fellow of the American Association for the Advancement of Science (AAAS), American Academy of Mechanics (AAM), American Institute of Aeronautics and Astronautics (AIAA), American Physical Society (APS), American Society of Mechanical Engineers (ASME), and the Combustion Institute.

His research interests include thermal-fluid sciences, numerical methods, applied mathematics, random data analysis, stochastic processes, and quantum computing.

== Biography ==
Born in Iran, Givi now lives in Pittsburgh. He received his bachelor's degree in mechanical engineering from the Youngstown State University in 1980 and his master's and Ph.D. in mechanical engineering from Carnegie Mellon University in 1982 and 1984, respectively. His dissertation was “Turbulent Reacting Flows (Probability Density, Mixing Layers, Jets, Plug Flow Reactors, Monte Carlo Method).”

Prior to joining the University of Pittsburgh in 2002, he held the rank of University Distinguished Professor in Aerospace Engineering at the State University of New York at Buffalo, where he received the Professor of the Year Award by Tau Beta Pi (2002).

== Research ==
Givi was first to demonstrate that the filtered density function is a tool for accurate prediction of turbulent combustion.

== Awards and honors ==
Givi received NASA's Public Service Medal (2005) and is among the first 15 engineering faculty nationwide who received the White House NSF Presidential Faculty Fellowship from former president George W. Bush.

In 2024, Givi presented the AIAA Dryden Lectureship in Research at the AIAA SciTech Forum. His lecture was “The Promise of Quantum Computing for Aerospace Science and Engineering.”

He was also invited to deliver the 13th Elsevier Distinguished Lecture in Mechanics in 2021 and the 11th Pratt & Whitney Distinguished Lecture in 2021.

His other awards include:

- Foreign Member of the Royal Academy of Engineering of Spain (Real Academia de Ingeniería de España)
- AIAA Sustained Service Award (2022)
- Carnegie Mellon University Alumni Achievement Award (2022)
- University of Pittsburgh Provost Distinguished Doctoral Mentor Award (2022)
- Carnegie Science Awards Honorable Mention – University/Post Secondary Educator (2017)
- Youngstown State University Distinguished Alumnus (2012)
- ASME Engineer of the Year in Pittsburgh (2007)
