= Bellán =

Bellán or Bellan is a surname. Notable people with the surname include:

- Alicia Bellán (1931–2018), Argentine actress
- Ferdinand Bellan (1897–1976), Austrian draughtsperson
- Josette Bellan, Romanian-French-American fluid dynamicist
- Juraj Bellan (born 1996), Slovak racing cyclist
- Steve Bellán (1849–1932), Cuban-American baseball player
