= Walter Lacarbonara =

20th and 21st-century Italian engineer and academic

- Born: 27 February 1968 (age 58); Italy
- Occupations: Academic; structural engineer
- Title: Professor of Structural Engineering

Academic background
- Education: Sapienza University of Rome; Virginia Tech
- Doctoral advisors: Giuseppe Rega; Ali H. Nayfeh

Academic work
- Era: 20th-21st centuries
- Discipline: Structural engineering
- Sub-discipline: Nonlinear dynamics; structural mechanics; mechanical metamaterials
- Institutions: Sapienza University of Rome

Walter Lacarbonara (born 27 February 1968) is an Italian structural engineer and academic specializing in nonlinear dynamics, structural mechanics, and mechanical metamaterials. He is a professor of Structural Engineering at the Sapienza University of Rome.

He has served as the editor-in-chief of Nonlinear Dynamics and has assisted with international conferences in nonlinear dynamics.

== Biography ==
Lacarbonara was born in Italy in 1968. He graduated from the Sapienza University of Rome in 1993 with a bachelor of structural engineering; and completed his master's degree in 1997 and a Ph.D in structural engineering in 1998 through a joint academic program between Sapienza University of Rome and Virginia Tech, under the supervision of Giuseppe Rega and Ali H. Nayfeh.

Lacarbonara joined the engineering faculty of Sapienza University, where he was subsequently appointed as Professor of Structural Mechanics. He has held visiting research appointments at international institutions, including Stanford University, the University of Maryland, and the University of Tsukuba in Japan.

Lacarbonara’s research focuses on nonlinear phenomena in structures and mechanical systems, including nonlinear vibrations, stability, reduced-order modeling, and vibration mitigation devices, addressing both theoretical and applied aspects of nonlinear structural mechanics. His research has also addressed mechanical metamaterials, hysteretic damping mechanisms, and nonlinear vibration absorbers and isolators, with applications to civil, mechanical, and aerospace engineering systems.

Lacarbonara has authored more than 140 peer-reviewed journal articles and 150 conference papers. The monograph Nonlinear Structural Mechanics: Theory, Dynamical Phenomena, and Modeling received scholarly reviews in several international journals; and was described as a comprehensive reference for modern nonlinear structural mechanics, suitable for both professionals and graduate students, noting its coverage of theoretical background, computational methods, and parametric investigations of nonlinear phenomena.

Lacarbonara has served as the editor-in-chief of Nonlinear Dynamics since 2017 and has participated in editorial activities for journals in mechanics and applied mathematics. He has been involved in the organization of international scientific conferences in nonlinear dynamics, including NODYCON.

In 2024, Lacarbonara was interviewed with a focus on digital transition in advanced engineering and aerospace.

== Selected published works ==
- Nonlinear Structural Mechanics: Theory, Dynamical Phenomena and Modeling. New York: Springer. 2013. p. 819. ISBN 978-1441912756.
