= William Sirignano =

American aerospace engineer (born 1938)

- Born: William Alfonso Sirignano; 1938 (age 87–88); New York, U.S.

Academic background
- Education: Rensselaer Polytechnic Institute (BEng); Princeton University (MA, PhD)
- Thesis: Theoretical study of nonlinear combustion instability: longitudinal mode (1964)
- Doctoral advisor: Luigi Crocco

Academic work
- Institutions: NASA; Princeton University; Carnegie Mellon University; University of California, Irvine
- Main interests: Combustion; turbulence; rocket engines; shock wave; propulsion

William Alfonso Sirignano (/sɪriːnˈjɑːnoʊ/ sih-reen-YAH-noh; born 1938) is an American aerospace engineer and fluid dynamicist. He is known for his theoretical work on resolving combustion instability problems in the Rocketdyne F-1 engine during the Apollo program, for the widely used Abramzon–Sirignano droplet vaporization model, and for pioneering the turbine-burner concept in jet propulsion.

Sirignano is a distinguished professor of mechanical and aerospace engineering at the University of California, Irvine (UCI) and a member of the National Academy of Engineering.

== Early life and education ==
Sirignano was born in New York in 1937 to an Italian American family. He attended the Rensselaer Polytechnic Institute (RPI) on a regents' scholarship, studying aeronautical engineering. He was a member of Sigma Xi, Tau Beta Pi, and Sigma Gamma Tau honor societies. He won RPI's Ricketts Prize and graduated with a Bachelor of Engineering degree in 1959.

Sirignano attended Princeton University with funding from the Daniel and Florence Guggenheim Foundation, graduating with a Master of Arts in aerospace and mechanical sciences in 1962. He studied under the Italian aeronautical engineer Luigi Crocco (1909–1986) and completed a doctorate sponsored by NASA in 1964. He was also mentored by Sau-Hai Lam. His dissertation dealt with combustion instability in liquid propellant rocket engines.

== Career ==
Sirignano worked on the Rocketdyne F-1 engine used in the Saturn V at NASA's Marshall Space Flight Center while still a graduate student at Princeton. After completing his studies, he joined Princeton's faculty as a professor of mechanical and aerospace engineering from 1973 to 1979. He was also a research fellow at United Aircraft in 1973.

Static fire of Rocketdyne F-1 engine (1966)

In 1979, Sirignano moved to Carnegie Mellon University, where he served as the George Tallman Ladd Professor and head of the Department of Mechanical Engineering until 1984. He joined UCI in 1985 as dean of the UC Irvine Samueli School of Engineering, a role he held until 1994. He helped the school develop an undergraduate degree in aerospace engineering. He returned full-time to research and teaching thereafter as a distinguished professor.

Sirignano's earliest research was on oscillatory pressure waves in rocket engines: sound waves trapped inside a combustion chamber can synchronize with the process of burning the fuel and become amplified, causing vibrations that can tear the engine apart. This amplification of waves was responsible for catastrophic failures in early rocket development, including the Saturn V's F-1 engine in the 1960s. He developed shock wave models of unstable combustors and theories for the nonlinear behavior of Helmholtz resonators used as acoustic dampers in combustion chambers. Sirignano also worked in spray combustion, developing theories of droplet vaporization and convective heating with applications in engine injectors and spray nozzles.

In 1989, Sirignano developed the Abramzon–Sirignano model for droplet vaporization with Boris Abramzon, which describes how a liquid fuel droplet shrinks as it evaporates in a hot gas flow. The model is incorporated into most major computational fluid dynamics (CFD) solvers used to simulate fuel sprays in engines. His research on the instability and atomization of thin liquid sheets and jets, addressing Kelvin–Helmholtz instability, capillary wave distortion, vorticity dynamics, and droplet formation contributed to the analytical understanding of fuel atomization and his textbook on the topic has been widely cited in the field.

Together with fellow UCI professor Feng Liu, Sirignano developed the turbine-burner concept in 1999, in which a combustor integrated directly into the turbine stages of a gas turbine engine supports continuous near-constant-temperature combustion. Researchers wrote that the design has higher efficiency and specific thrust than conventional designs, in which it is placed upstream of the turbine, at the expense of increased fuel consumption. He also developed a miniature liquid-fuel film combustor concept for small-scale propulsion and published research on combustion at supercritical and transcritical conditions, flame spread across liquid and solid fuel, and turbulent combustion in reciprocating and rotary internal combustion engines.

Sirignano was appointed a fellow of the American Institute of Aeronautics and Astronautics (AIAA) in 1987, the American Society of Mechanical Engineers (ASME) in 1989, and the American Association for the Advancement of Science in 1992. Former students include Josette Bellan, a senior research scientist at NASA's Jet Propulsion Laboratory, Peyman Givi, a distinguished professor of mechanical engineering at the University of Pittsburgh, and Chung K. Law, the Robert H. Goddard Professor at Princeton University. He is a member of the standing committee for the Army Research Laboratory's Technical Assessment Board. He chaired the National Research Council's committee on microgravity research and was a touring lecturer for NATO.

== Awards ==
- Spirit of St. Louis Medal, ASME (2024)
- James Hart Wyld Propulsion Award, AIAA (2009)
- National Academy of Engineering (2002)
- Alfred C. Egerton Medal, The Combustion Institute (1996)
- Oppenheim Prize, IDERS (1993)
- Freeman Scholar Award, ASME (1992)
- Pendray Aerospace Literature Award, AIAA (1991)

== Publications ==
- Fluid Dynamics and Transport of Droplets and Sprays (Cambridge University Press, 1999; 2nd ed. 2010)
