= Ashwani K Gupta =

Ashwani K. Gupta
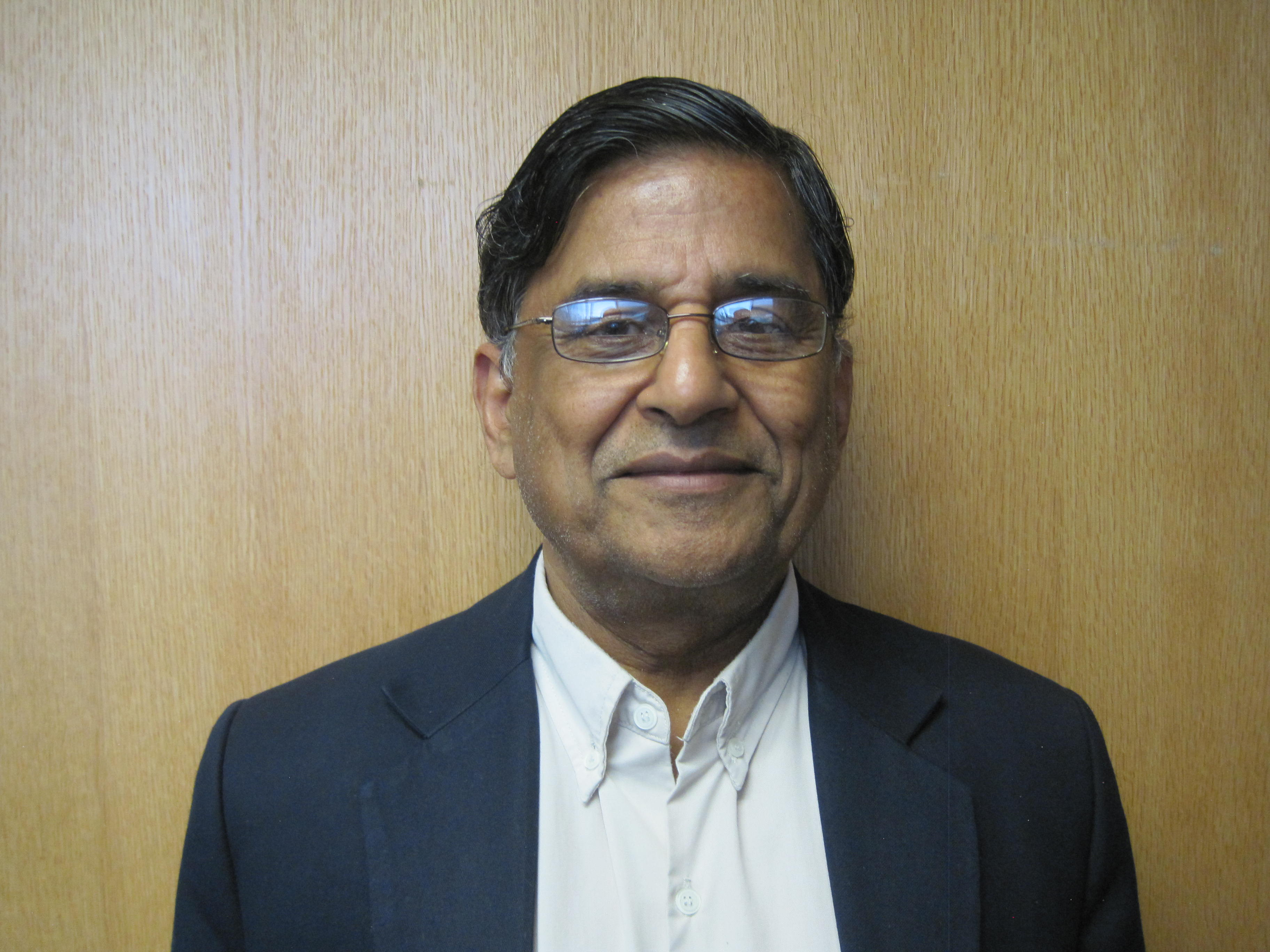
- Born: October 23, 1948 (age 78)
- Education: Southampton University; Sheffield University
- Engineering career
- Discipline: Mechanical Engineering
- Projects: Fuels and Combustion technology, Biofuels, High Intensity Gas Turbine combustion, Supersonic combustion, Supercritical rocket injector mixing, Combustion sulfur chemistry, Pollutant formation and near zero emission, and Laser Diagnostics

Ashwani Kumar Gupta (born 1948) is a British-American engineer and educator with research focus on combustion, fuels, fuel reforming, bio-fuels advanced diagnostics, High Temperature Air Combustion (called HiTAC), and high-intensity distributed combustion, green combustion turbine, micro-combustion, and air pollution. He is a Distinguished University Professor and Minta Martin Professor at the University of Maryland. Gupta is also Professor of Mechanical Engineering at the University of Maryland and Director of Combustion Laboratory. He is also an Affiliate Professor at Institute of Physical Science and Technology, University of Maryland which is part of the University of Maryland College of Computer, Mathematical and Natural Sciences.

He is known for his work on swirl flows, combustion, high temperature air combustion, distributed high intensity green combustion, fuel reforming, and bio-fuels.

== Education ==
Gupta worked as a Trainee Engineer at International Combustion, UK from 1967 to 1971. From 1969 to 1970 he attended University of Southampton, UK, where he was awarded a Master's degree in Aeronautics and Astronautics in 1971. He attended University of Sheffield and was awarded a doctorate degree in Fuel Technology and Chemical Engineering in 1973. He continued to work at Sheffield University as a Research Fellow and Independent Research Worker until 1976. He moved to MIT in 1977 as a member of research staff at Energy Laboratory and Department of Chemical Engineering where he worked on swirl flows, combustion, droplet combustion, coal-water slurry combustion, fuels, and advanced laser diagnostics development. In 1983, he moved to the University of Maryland as an associate professor of Mechanical Engineering and was promoted to full Professor in 1988. In 2008, he was elected as a Distinguished University Professor at the University of Maryland and in 2023 as Minta Martin Professor.

Gupta served as visiting professor at Nagoya University. Gupta is an Honorary Fellow of the American Society of Mechanical Engineers (ASME) and Fellow of American Institute of Aeronautics and Astronautics (AIAA), Royal Academy of Engineering (FREng) UK, Canadian Academy of Engineering, Society of Automotive Engineers (SAE), American Association for the Advancement of Science (AAAS), and Royal Aeronautical Society (RAeS, UK), and Member of the Combustion Institute as well as the European Academy of Science and Arts (EASA).

== Honors and awards ==
Gupta was awarded Honorary Doctorates from the University of Wisconsin, Milwaukee in 2014, King Mungkut University of Technology, North Bangkok, Bestowed by the Queen of Thailand, 2014, and Derby University, UK in 2015. He was awarded Higher Doctorates (DSc) form Southampton University, UK in 2013 and Sheffield University, UK in 1986 for his international recognition, numerous publications of original work and substantial contributions to learning in Engineering and Applied Science.

Gupta received the AIAA Energy Systems Award in 1990, Propellants & Combustion Award in 1999, Air Breathing Propulsion award in 2014 and Pendray Aerospace Literature Award in 2017. He received the ASME George Westinghouse Gold Medal in 1998, James Harry Potter Gold Medal Award in 2003, James N. Landis Medal Award in 2004, Worcester Reed Warner Medal in 2008, Holley Medal in 2010, ASME-AIM Percy Nicholls award in 2011, Melville Medal in 2013, ASME Soichiro Honda Medal in 2018. He received ASEE Ralph Coats Roe award in 2015. At the University of Maryland, Gupta was awarded the President Kirwan Research Award in 2003 and College of Engineering Research Award in 2006. Gupta was awarded Best Paper awards for the work presented at ASME conferences in 1991, 1997 and 2003, and at AIAA conferences in 1987, 1989, 1992, 1994, 2006, 2010 and 2012.

== Professional activities ==
Gupta serves as co-editor of the Environmental and Energy Science series published by CRC/Taylor & Francis Press. He serves as Associate Editor of Applied Energy Journal, Journal of Propulsion and Power, International Journal of Spray and Combustion Dynamics,; and editor-in-chief of APEC Youth Journal (S. Korea). He served as Director of Propulsion and Energy Group at AIAA and also on the AIAA Board of Directors (2007-2013). He served as deputy director of Energy group (2000-2007), Chairman of AIAA Terrestrial Energy Systems Technical Committee (1991-2000) and Chairman of the AIAA Propellants and Combustion Technical Committee (1988-1990). Gupta served as a Member of the Technical Advisory Group (TAG) in the President Council of Advisors on Science and Technology (PCAST). He serves as a member of the advisory board at Virtuhcon, Freiburg Institute, Germany. He serves as Chair of the Board of Boiler Rules in the state of Maryland, appointed by the Governor of Maryland.

== Bibliography ==
=== Books ===
- Swirl Flows, A.K. Gupta, D.G. Lilley, and N. Syred, Gordon and Breach/Abacus Press, UK, 1984, 475 pages.
- Flowfield Modeling and Diagnostics, A.K. Gupta and D.G. Lilley, Gordon Breach/Abacus Press, UK, 1985, 414 pages.
- High Temperature Air Combustion—from energy conservation to pollution reduction, H. Tsuji, A. K. Gupta, T. Hasegawa, K. Katsuki, K. Kishimoto and M. Morita, CRC Press, 2003, 401 pages. [First printing sold out within 6 weeks of publication].

=== Selected publications ===
- Singh, P.; Déparrois, N.; Burra, K.G.; Bhattacharya, S.; Gupta, A.K. (2019). "Energy recovery from cross-linked polyethylene wastes using pyrolysis and CO2 assisted gasification". Applied Energy. 254 113722. doi:10.1016/j.apenergy.2019.113722.
- Burra, K.G.; Gupta, A.K. (2018). "Synergistic effects in steam gasification of combined biomass and plastic waste mixtures". Applied Energy. 211: 230–236. Bibcode:2018ApEn..211..230B. doi:10.1016/j.apenergy.2017.10.130.
- Khalil, Ahmed E.E.; Gupta, Ashwani K. (2018). "Fostering distributed combustion in a swirl burner using prevaporized liquid fuels". Applied Energy. 211: 513–522. Bibcode:2018ApEn..211..513K. doi:10.1016/j.apenergy.2017.11.068.
- Gupta, A.K.; Ibrahim, S.; Al Shoaibi, A. (2016). "Advances in sulfur chemistry for treatment of acid gases". Progress in Energy and Combustion Science. 54: 65–92. Bibcode:2016PECS...54...65G. doi:10.1016/j.pecs.2015.11.001.
- Khalil, Ahmed E.E.; Gupta, Ashwani K. (2016). "Fuel property effects on distributed combustion". Fuel. 171: 116–124. Bibcode:2016Fuel..171..116K. doi:10.1016/j.fuel.2015.12.068.
- Khalil, Ahmed E.E.; Gupta, Ashwani K. (2015). "Impact of pressure on high intensity colorless distributed combustion". Fuel. 143: 334–342. Bibcode:2015Fuel..143..334K. doi:10.1016/j.fuel.2014.11.061.
- Wierzbicki, Teresa A.; Lee, Ivan C.; Gupta, Ashwani K. (2015). "Rh assisted catalytic oxidation of jet fuel surrogates in a meso-scale combustor". Applied Energy. 145: 1–7. Bibcode:2015ApEn..145....1W. doi:10.1016/j.apenergy.2015.01.097.
- Singh, A.V.; Yu, M.; Gupta, A.K.; Bryden, K.M. (2013). "Thermo-acoustic behavior of a swirl stabilized diffusion flame with heterogeneous sensors". Applied Energy. 106: 1–16. Bibcode:2013ApEn..106....1S. doi:10.1016/j.apenergy.2013.01.044.
- Selim, H.; Al Shoaibi, A.; Gupta, A.K. (2011). "Experimental examination of flame chemistry in hydrogen sulfide-based flames". Applied Energy. 88 (8): 2601–2611. Bibcode:2011ApEn...88.2601S. doi:10.1016/j.apenergy.2011.02.029.
- Arghode, Vaibhav K.; Gupta, Ashwani K. (2011). "Hydrogen addition effects on methane–air colorless distributed combustion flames". International Journal of Hydrogen Energy. 36 (10): 6292–6302. Bibcode:2011IJHE...36.6292A. doi:10.1016/j.ijhydene.2011.02.028.
- Ahmed, I.I.; Nipattummakul, N.; Gupta, A.K. (2011). "Characteristics of syngas from co-gasification of polyethylene and woodchips". Applied Energy. 88 (1). Elsevier BV: 165–174. Bibcode:2011ApEn...88..165A. doi:10.1016/j.apenergy.2010.07.007. ISSN 0306-2619.
- Shirsat, V.; Gupta, A.K. (2011). "Performance characteristics of methanol and kerosene fuelled meso-scale heat-recirculating combustors". Applied Energy. 88 (12): 5069–5082. Bibcode:2011ApEn...88.5069S. doi:10.1016/j.apenergy.2011.07.019.
- Vijayan, V.; Gupta, A.K. (2010). "Combustion and heat transfer at meso-scale with thermal recuperation". Applied Energy. 87 (8): 2628–2639. doi:10.1016/j.apenergy.2010.03.011.
- Abdelhafez, A.; Gupta, A. K. (2010). "Effect of Swirl on Shock Structure in Underexpanded Supersonic Airflow". Journal of Propulsion and Power. 26 (2): 215–229. doi:10.2514/1.45716. ISSN 0748-4658.
- Gupta, A. K.; Bolz, S.; Hasegawa, T. (1999-09-01). "Effect of Air Preheat Temperature and Oxygen Concentration on Flame Structure and Emission". Journal of Energy Resources Technology. 121 (3). ASME International: 209–216. doi:10.1115/1.2795984. ISSN 0195-0738.
- Gupta, A.K.; Syred, N.; Beér, J.M. (1975). "Fluctuating temperature and pressure effects on the noise output of swirl burners". Symposium (International) on Combustion. 15 (1): 1367–1377. doi:10.1016/S0082-0784(75)80396-1.

=== Patents ===
- Gupta, A. K., Fuel Efficient Ultra Low Emission Colorless Distributed Combustor for Gas Turbines in Stationary and Propulsion Applications, US patent No. 14/223378, Issued on September 6, 2016
- Gupta, A. K.: Fuel Efficient Ultra Low Emission Colorless Distributed Combustor for Gas Turbine Application in Stationary and Propulsion Systems, US8695350B2, also published as US20110023492, Issued on April 15, 2014.
- Gupta, A.K.: Method and system for recovering sulfur in the thermal stage of a Claus reactor, US Patent No. 8,449,860B2, Issued on May 28, 2013.
- Yang, W., Blasiak, W. and Gupta, A.K.: A novel routine to generate renewable liquid matters and fuels using ultra high temperature steam pyrolysis of lingo-cellulose based raw material, Swedish Patent No. 535121, Issued on March 20, 2012.
