= Pendray Aerospace Literature Award =

Annual aerospace writing award

The Pendray Aerospace Literature Award is an annual award presented by the American Institute of Aeronautics and Astronautics (AIAA). Established in 1951, it is named in honor of George Edward Pendray, a founder and president of the American Rocket Society, predecessor to the AIAA.

The award is presented for an outstanding contribution to literature on aeronautics and astronautics in the recent past. The emphasis is placed upon the high quality or major influence of written works rather than on the technological contribution alone. Recipients have included authors of influential textbooks, landmark research papers, and seminal monographs spanning fields such as computational fluid dynamics, rocket propulsion, combustion, astrodynamics, and flight mechanics. The award is intended as an incentive for aerospace professionals to write eloquently and persuasively about their field, encompassing editorials as well as papers or books.

The award is generally presented at the AIAA Science and Technology Forum and Exposition. Nominations are accepted annually, typically between February and June, with endorsement letters due the following month.

== History ==
The award traces its origins to the American Rocket Society, of which G. Edward Pendray was a founding member. Following the merger of the ARS and the Institute of the Aerospace Sciences to form the AIAA in 1963, the award was carried forward under the new organization. Recipients in the award's early decades included pioneers such as Walter Dornberger, Krafft Ehricke, and Luigi Crocco.

As of 2026, 71 awards have been given since its establishment in 1951.

== List of recipients ==
- 1951: (United States) George Paul Sutton
- 1952: (United States) Maurice J. Zucrow
- 1953: (China) Qian Xuesen
- 1954: (United States) Martin Summerfield
- 1955: (Germany) Walter Dornberger
- 1956: (Romania) Hermann Oberth
- 1957: (United States) Grayson Merrill
- 1958: (United States) Homer E. Newell
- 1959: (Turkey) Ali B. Cambel
- 1960: (Italy) Luigi Crocco
- 1961: (Germany) Krafft Ehricke
- 1962: (United States) Howard Seifert
- 1964: (United States) Andrew G. Haley
- 1965: (United States) Dinsmore Alter
- 1966: (Poland) Antoni K. Oppenheim
- 1967: (United States) Robert A. Gross
- 1968: (United States) Arthur E. Bryson
- 1970: (United States) Wilmot N. Hess
- 1971: (Hungary) Nicholas J. Hoff
- 1972: (United States) Edward W. Price
- 1973: (United States) Marcus F. Heidmann
- 1973: (United States) Richard J. Priem
- 1974: (United States) Frederick I. Ordway III
- 1975: (United States) William R. Sears
- 1976: (United States) Stanford S. Penner
- 1977: (United States) George Leitmann
- 1978: (United States) Arnold M. Kuethe
- 1979: (United States) Henry J. Kelley
- 1980: (United States) Fred E. C. Culick
- 1981: (United States) Robert B. Hotz
- 1982: (Italy) Angelo Miele
- 1983: (United States) Marvin E. Goldstein
- 1984: (United States) Leonard Meirovitch
- 1985: (United States) Warren C. Strahle
- 1986: (United States) Wayne R. Johnson
- 1987: (United States) Richard H. Battin
- 1988: (United States) Gordon C. Oates
- 1989: (India) Budugur Lakshminarayana
- 1990: (United States) John Junkins
- 1991: (United States) William Sirignano
- 1992: (Poland) Janusz Stanisław Przemieniecki
- 1993: (United States) Forman A. Williams
- 1995: (Palestine) Ali H. Nayfeh
- 1996: (United States) John D. Anderson
- 1997: (United States) Joseph A. Schetz
- 1998: (India) Satya N. Atluri
- 1999: (India) Vinod J. Modi
- 2000: (United States) Ben Zinn
- 2002: (United States) George Paul Sutton (posthumous, second award)
- 2003: (Taiwan) Wei Shyy
- 2004: (China) Chung K. Law
- 2005: (France) Sébastien Candel
- 2006: (China) Christopher K. W. Tam
- 2007: (Australia) Alexander Smits
- 2008: (China) Vigor Yang
- 2009: (United States) Kenneth K. Kuo
- 2010: (Israel) Moshe Matalon
- 2011: (United States) William F. Milliken Jr.
- 2012: (United States) Robert F. Stengel
- 2013: (United States) Ronald F. Probstein
- 2014: (Lebanon) Wassim Michael Haddad
- 2015: (United States) Antony Jameson
- 2016: (United States) David K. Schmidt
- 2017: (India) Ashwani K Gupta
- 2018: (Romania) Josette Bellan
- 2019: (Armenia) Naira Hovakimyan
- 2020: (United States) Russell M. Cummings
- 2021: (United States) Timothy C. Lieuwen
- 2023: (India) Balakumar Balachandran
- 2024: (United Kingdom) Ann Dowling
- 2025: (United States) Joseph M. Powers

== See also ==
- American Institute of Aeronautics and Astronautics
- Frank J. Malina Astronautics Medal
