= Chung K. Law =

Engineering researcher

- Born: 31 August 1947 (age 78); Republic of China
- Education: University of Alberta; University of Toronto; University of California San Diego
- Known for: Combustion; Law limit
- Scientific career
- Workplaces: Princeton University; University of California Davis; Northwestern University; General Motors Research Laboratories
- Thesis: Studies on droplet combustion (1973)
- Doctoral advisor: Forman A. Williams
- Doctoral students: Xiaolin Zheng

Chung King Law (Chinese: 羅忠敬;born 31 August 1947;also known as Ed Law) is a Chinese-born American scientist and a Robert H. Goddard professor at Princeton University. He is a specialist in combustion science.

== Career and research ==
Law received his bachelors and masters degree, respectively from University of Alberta and University of Toronto. He completed his PhD in 1973 under the supervision of Forman A. Williams at University of California San Diego.

He worked at the General Motors Research Laboratories for two years and was a postdoctoral researcher at Princeton University under William Sirignano before joining the faculty at the Northwestern University in 1976. He joined the faculty of University of California, Davis in 1984 and left in 1988, to join the faculty at Princeton University, where he is currently the Robert H. Goddard professor.

Law has made several contributions to the combustion field, especially, in connection with droplet dynamics and burning, laminar flame speed and stretched flames, chemical mechanism reduction.

== Books ==
- Chung K. Law (2006). Combustion Physics. Cambridge University Press. ISBN 978-0521154215.

== Honors and awards ==
Law holds many honors and awards. He is an elected fellow of ASME (1989), AIAA (1992), APS (2006), the American Academy of Arts and Sciences (2010), the American Association for the Advancement of Science (2012), Combustion Institute (2018). He is an elected member of the US National Academy of Engineering (2002). He is a past president of the Combustion Institute (2000-2004).

- Silver Combustion Medal (1990) from The Combustion Institute
- Alfred C. Egerton Gold Medal (2006) from The Combustion Institute
- Pendray Aerospace Literature Award (2004) from AIAA

The journal Combustion and Flame issued a special issue commemorating Law's 70th birthday in 2018.
