= Naira Hovakimyan =

Armenian control theorist

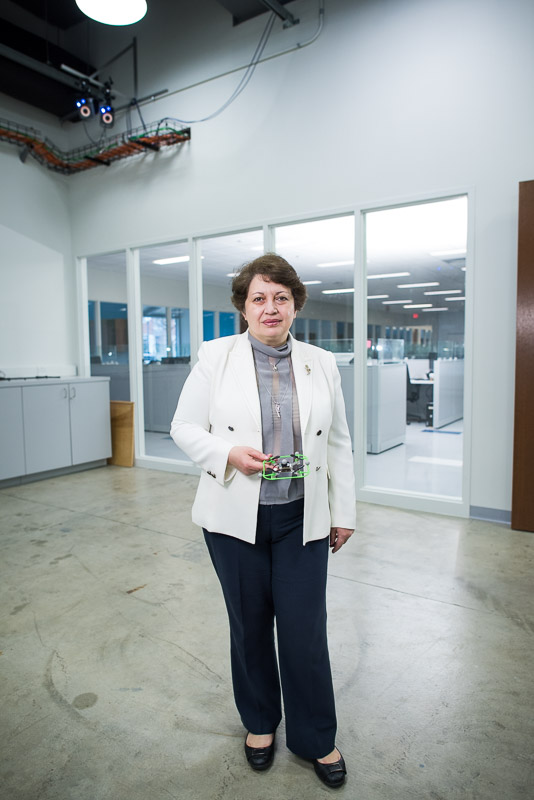
- Born: September 21, 1966; Yerevan, Armenia
- Citizenship: Armenian American
- Education: Yerevan State University, Yerevan
- Known for: L1 adaptive control; Safe learning in autonomous systems; Transition of robust adaptive controls to aerospace industry; Cooperative control of autonomous systems; Differential games on manifolds; Application of robotics to elderly care
- Awards: IEEE CSS Distinguished Lecturer(2026); IFAC Fellow(2025); ASME Fellow(2023); AIAA Pendray Aerospace Literature Award(2019); IEEE Fellow(2018); AIAA Fellow(2017); CSS Award for Technical Excellence in Aerospace Control(2017); Society of Women Engineers Achievement Award (2015); Humboldt prize for lifetime achievements, Alexander von Humboldt foundation, Germany(2014); AIAA Mechanics and Control of Flight award(2011); Pride at Boeing Award Recipient (2004, 2005, 2007)
- Scientific career
- Fields: Adaptive control, Robust control, Differential Games, Machine Learning, Flight Control and Robotics
- Workplaces: University of Illinois at Urbana–Champaign; Yerevan State University, Yerevan; Institute of Applied Mathematics of Russian Academy of Sciences, Moscow
- Academic advisors: Arik Melikyan

Naira Hovakimyan (born September 21, 1966) is an Armenian control theorist who holds the W. Grafton and Lillian B. Wilkins professorship of the Mechanical Science and Engineering at the University of Illinois at Urbana-Champaign. She is the director of AVIATE Center at UIUC, funded through a NASA University Leadership Initiative. She was the inaugural director of the Intelligent Robotics Laboratory during 2015–2017, associated with the Coordinated Science Laboratory at the University of Illinois at Urbana-Champaign.

== Education ==
Naira Hovakimyan received her MS degree in Theoretical Mechanics and Applied Mathematics in 1988 from Yerevan State University in Armenia. She got her Ph.D. in Physics and Mathematics in 1992, in Moscow, from the Institute of Applied Mathematics of Russian Academy of Sciences, majoring in optimal control and differential games.

== Academic life ==
Before joining the faculty of the University of Illinois at Urbana–Champaign in 2008, Naira Hovakimyan has spent time as a research scientist at Stuttgart University in Germany, at INRIA in France, at Georgia Institute of Technology, and she was on faculty of Aerospace and Ocean engineering of Virginia Tech during 2003–2008. She is currently W. Grafton and Lillian B. Wilkins Professor of Mechanical Science and Engineering at UIUC. In 2015, she was named as inaugural director for Intelligent Robotics Laboratory of CSL at UIUC. Currently she is the director of AVIATE Center at UIUC, funded through a NASA University Leadership Initiative. She has co-authored two books, ten book chapters, thirteen patents, and more than 500 journal and conference papers.

== Research areas ==
Her research interests are in control and optimization, autonomous systems, machine learning, cybersecurity, neural networks, game theory and their applications in aerospace, robotics, mechanical, agricultural, electrical, petroleum, biomedical engineering and elderly care.

== Honors ==
She is the 2011 recipient of AIAA Mechanics and Control of Flight award, the 2015 recipient of SWE Achievement Award, the 2017 recipient of IEEE CSS Award for Technical Excellence in Aerospace Controls, and the 2019 recipient of AIAA Pendray Aerospace Literature Award. In 2014 she was awarded the Humboldt prize for her lifetime achievements and was recognized as Hans Fischer senior fellow of Technical University of Munich. She is Fellow and life member of AIAA, Fellow of IEEE, Fellow of ASME, Senior Member of National Academy of Inventors, and Fellow of IFAC. In 2015 and 2023 she was recognized as outstanding advisor by Engineering Council of UIUC. In 2024 she was recognized by College Award for Excellence in Translational research. In 2025 she was recognized by College Award for Excellence in Graduate Student Mentoring. She is IEEE CSS Distinguished Lecturer for 2026-2028. Naira is co-founder and Chief Scientist of Intelinair. Naira is co-founder and CEO of Kestrel Robotics.

She is named 2017 Commencement Speaker of the American University of Armenia. She has been listed among 50 Global Armenians in the world by Mediamax and was a member of the FAST (The Foundation for Armenian Science and Technology) advisory board. She is also advising a few startup companies.

In 2021 she was one of the speakers of TEDxYerevan event. In 2022, she was awarded a Fulbright fellowship from the US Department of State. In 2022, she founded the AVIATE Center of flying cars at UIUC.
