= List of Tau Beta Pi chapters =

Tau Beta Pi is engineering honor society that was established in 1885 at Lehigh University.

== Collegiate chapters ==
Following is a list of Tau Beta Pi collegiate chapters, with active chapters indicated in bold and inactive chapters in italics.

Chapter	Abbrev	Charter date and range	Institution	Location	State or district	Status	Ref.
**Pennsylvania Alpha**	PA A	June 15, 1885	Lehigh University	Bethlehem	Pennsylvania	Active	
**Michigan Alpha**	MI A	November 5, 1892	Michigan State University	East Lansing	Michigan	Active	
**Indiana Alpha**	IN A	April 10, 1893	Purdue University	West Lafayette	Indiana	Active	
**New Jersey Alpha**	NJ A	March 27, 1896	Stevens Institute of Technology	Hoboken	New Jersey	Active	
**Illinois Alpha**	IL A	June 2, 1897	University of Illinois at Urbana-Champaign	Urbana	Illinois	Active	
**Wisconsin Alpha**	WI A	May 5, 1899	University of Wisconsin–Madison	Madison	Wisconsin	Active	
**Ohio Alpha**	OH A	May 19, 1900	Case Western Reserve University	Cleveland	Ohio	Active	
**Kentucky Alpha**	KY A	April 5, 1902	University of Kentucky	Lexington	Kentucky	Active	
**New York Alpha**	NY A	April 11, 1902	Columbia University	New York City	New York	Active	
**Missouri Alpha**	MO A	November 15, 1902	University of Missouri	Columbia	Missouri	Active	
**Michigan Beta**	MI B	August 6, 1904	Michigan Technological University	Houghton	Michigan	Active	
**Colorado Alpha**	CO A	May 5, 1905	Colorado School of Mines	Golden	Colorado	Active	
**Colorado Beta**	CO B	June 8, 1905	University of Colorado at Boulder	Boulder	Colorado	Active	
**Illinois Beta**	IL B	April 6, 1906	Illinois Institute of Technology	Chicago	Illinois	Active	
**New York Beta**	NY B	May 16, 1906	Syracuse University	Syracuse	New York	Active	
**Michigan Gamma**	MI G	June 14, 1906	University of Michigan	Ann Arbor	Michigan	Active	
**Missouri Beta**	MO B	December 21, 1906	Missouri University of Science and Technology	Rolla	Missouri	Active	
**California Alpha**	CA A	April 10, 1907	University of California, Berkeley	Berkeley	California	Active	
**Iowa Alpha**	IA A	December 20, 1907	Iowa State University	Ames	Iowa	Active	
**New York Gamma**	NY G	June 12, 1908 – 1916; 1936	Rensselaer Polytechnic Institute	Troy	New York	Active	(Note: The chapter went inactive when the institute's policy stopped access to students' grades, making it impossible to identify those who were eligible for membership. The chapter was reinstated when the institute's policy changed.)
**Iowa Beta**	IA B	March 30, 1909	University of Iowa	Iowa City	Iowa	Active	
**Minnesota Alpha**	MN A	June 9, 1909	University of Minnesota Twin Cities	Minneapolis	Minnesota	Active	
**New York Delta**	NY D	January 17, 1910	Cornell University	Ithaca	New York	Active	
**Massachusetts Alpha**	MA A	May 14, 1910	Worcester Polytechnic Institute	Worcester	Massachusetts	Active	
**Maine Alpha**	ME A	1911	University of Maine	Orono	Maine	Active	
**Pennsylvania Beta**	PA B	May 4, 1912	Pennsylvania State University	State College	Pennsylvania	Active	
**Washington Alpha**	WA A	June 4, 1912	University of Washington	Seattle	Washington	Active	
**Arkansas Alpha**	AR A	December 14, 1914	University of Arkansas	Fayetteville	Arkansas	Active	
**Kansas Alpha**	KS A	December 17, 1914	University of Kansas	Lawrence	Kansas	Active	
**Ohio Beta**	OH B	November 26, 1915	University of Cincinnati	Cincinnati	Ohio	Active	
**Pennsylvania Gamma**	PA G	February 19, 1916	Carnegie Mellon University	Pittsburgh	Pennsylvania	Active	
**Texas Alpha**	TX A	June 10, 1916	University of Texas at Austin	Austin	Texas	Active	
**Ohio Gamma**	OH G	February 12, 1921	Ohio State University	Columbus	Ohio	Active	
**Maryland Alpha**	MD A	April 9, 1921	Johns Hopkins University	Baltimore	Maryland	Active	
**Pennsylvania Delta**	PA D	April 11, 1921	University of Pennsylvania	Philadelphia	Pennsylvania	Active	
**Pennsylvania Epsilon**	PA E	May 7, 1921	Lafayette College	Easton	Pennsylvania	Active	
**Virginia Alpha**	VA A	May 28, 1921	University of Virginia	Charlottesville	Virginia	Active	
**Alabama Alpha**	AL A	May 30, 1921	Auburn University	Auburn	Alabama	Active	
**California Beta**	CA B	June 11, 1921	California Institute of Technology	Pasadena	California	Active	
**West Virginia Alpha**	WV A	June 3, 1922	West Virginia University	Morgantown	West Virginia	Active	
**Missouri Gamma**	MO G	June 5, 1922	Washington University in St. Louis	St. Louis	Missouri	Active	
**Massachusetts Beta**	MA B	June 5, 1922	Massachusetts Institute of Technology	Cambridge	Massachusetts	Active	
**Washington Beta**	WA B	March 17, 1923	Washington State University	Pullman	Washington	Active	
Massachusetts Gamma	MA G	June 6, 1923 – 1938	Harvard University	Cambridge	Massachusetts	Inactive	(Note: The chapter's charter was withdrawn when Harvard discontinued its undergraduate engineering instruction.)
**Connecticut Alpha**	CT A	December 15, 1923	Yale University	New Haven	Connecticut	Active	
**Oregon Alpha**	OR A	March 29, 1924	Oregon State University	Corvallis	Oregon	Active	
**Georgia Alpha**	GA A	February 6, 1925	Georgia Institute of Technology	Atlanta	Georgia	Active	
**North Carolina Alpha**	NC A	October 10, 1925	North Carolina State University	Raleigh	North Carolina	Active	
**Oklahoma Alpha**	OK A	April 3, 1926	University of Oklahoma	Norman	Oklahoma	Active	
**Montana Alpha**	MT A	April 15, 1926	Montana State University	Bozeman	Montana	Active	
**Alabama Beta**	AL B	November 20, 1926	University of Alabama	Tuscaloosa	Alabama	Active	
**Arizona Alpha**	AZ A	November 24, 1926	University of Arizona	Tucson	Arizona	Active	
**Massachusetts Delta**	MA D	December 16, 1927	Tufts University	Medford	Massachusetts	Active	
**South Carolina Alpha**	SC A	November 23, 1928	Clemson University	Clemson	South Carolina	Active	
**North Carolina Beta**	NC B	November 24, 1928 – 1938	University of North Carolina at Chapel Hill	Chapel Hill	North Carolina	Active	(Note: The chapter's charter was withdrawn when the university's undergraduate engineering curricula was moved to North Carolina State University where there was already a Tau Beta Phi chapter.)
**Indiana Beta**	IN B	December 8, 1928	Rose-Hulman Institute of Technology	Terre Haute	Indiana	Active	
**Mississippi Alpha**	MS A	December 15, 1928	Mississippi State University	Starkville	Mississippi	Active	
**Tennessee Alpha**	TN A	November 15, 1929	University of Tennessee	Knoxville	Tennessee	Active	
**Maryland Beta**	MD B	November 21, 1929	University of Maryland, College Park	College Park	Maryland	Active	
**Pennsylvania Zeta**	PA Z	November 24, 1930	Drexel University	Philadelphia	Pennsylvania	Active	
New York Epsilon (See **New York Rho**)	NY E	December 4, 1931 – 1974	New York University	Bronx	New York	Consolidated	(Note: New York Epsilon and New York Zeta merged to form New York Rho when their institutions merged into the Polytechnic Institute of New York.)
New York Zeta (See **New York Rho**)	NY Z	December 5, 1931 – 1974	Polytechnic Institute of Brooklyn	Brooklyn	New York	Consolidated	
**Wisconsin Beta**	WI B	December 3, 1932	Marquette University	Milwaukee	Wisconsin	Active	
**Virginia Beta**	VA B	November 24, 1933	Virginia Polytechnic Institute and State University	Blacksburg	Virginia	Active	
**Delaware Alpha**	DE A	November 25, 1933	University of Delaware	Newark	Delaware	Active	
**Utah Alpha**	UT A	December 8, 1933	University of Utah	Salt Lake City	Utah	Active	
**New Jersey Beta**	NJ B	December 14, 1934	Rutgers, The State University of New Jersey	New Brunswick	New Jersey	Active	
**California Gamma**	CA G	January 26, 1935	Stanford University	Stanford	California	Active	
**Louisiana Alpha**	LA A	November 30, 1936	Louisiana State University	Baton Rouge	Louisiana	Active	
**Louisiana Beta**	LA B	December 1, 1936	Tulane University of Louisiana	New Orleans	Louisiana	Active	
**Texas Beta**	TX B	December 11, 1937	Texas Tech University	Lubbock	Texas	Active	
**New York Eta**	NY H	November 30, 1940	City College of the City University of New York	New York City	New York	Active	
**Texas Gamma**	TX G	December 18, 1940	Rice University	Houston	Texas	Active	
**Michigan Delta**	MI D	January 20, 1941	University of Detroit Mercy	Detroit	Michigan	Active	
**New Jersey Gamma**	NJ G	November 29, 1941	New Jersey Institute of Technology	Newark	New Jersey	Active	
**New York Theta**	NY Th	December 4, 1941	Clarkson University	Potsdam	New York	Active	
**Illinois Gamma**	IL G	December 6, 1941	Northwestern University	Evanston	Illinois	Active	
**Massachusetts Epsilon**	MA E	December 13, 1941	Northeastern University	Boston	Massachusetts	Active	
**Tennessee Beta**	TN B	December 7, 1946	Vanderbilt University	Nashville	Tennessee	Active	
**California Delta**	CA D	January 10, 1947	University of Southern California	Los Angeles	California	Active	
**New York Iota**	NY I	January 11, 1947	Cooper Union School of Engineering	New York City	New York	Active	
**Pennsylvania Eta**	PA H	December 11, 1947	Bucknell University	Lewisburg	Pennsylvania	Active	
**New York Kappa**	NY K	December 13, 1947	University of Rochester	Rochester	New York	Active	
**North Carolina Gamma**	NC G	January 10, 1948	Duke University	Durham	North Carolina	Active	
**Texas Delta**	TX D	October 11, 1948	Texas A&M University and Texas A&M University at Qatar	College Station and Doha, Qatar	Texas	Active	
**Connecticut Beta**	CT B	January 8, 1949	University of Connecticut	Storrs	Connecticut	Active	
**North Dakota Alpha**	ND A	January 14, 1950	North Dakota State University	Fargo	North Dakota	Active	
**New Hampshire Alpha**	NH A	December 9, 1950	University of New Hampshire	Durham	New Hampshire	Active	
**Louisiana Gamma**	LA G	February 17, 1951	Louisiana Tech University	Ruston	Louisiana	Active	
**Michigan Epsilon**	MI E	March 10, 1951	Wayne State University	Detroit	Michigan	Active	
**California Epsilon**	CA E	March 29, 1952	University of California, Los Angeles	Los Angeles	California	Active	
New York Lambda	NY L	April 19, 1952 – 1993	Pratt Institute	Brooklyn	New York	Inactive	(Note: The chapter's charter's was withdrawn when Pratt Institute stopped offering engineering education.)
**Ohio Delta**	OH D	February 21, 1953	Ohio University	Athens	Ohio	Active	
**Ohio Epsilon**	OH E	February 22, 1953	Cleveland State University	Cleveland	Ohio	Active	
Colorado Gamma	CO G	January 29, 1954 – May 30, 1975	University of Denver	Denver	Colorado	Inactive	(Note: The chapter surrendered its charter when the university discontinued its engineering education.)
**Rhode Island Alpha**	RI A	February 12, 1954	Brown University	Providence	Rhode Island	Active	
**Rhode Island Beta**	RI B	February 13, 1954	University of Rhode Island	Kingston	Rhode Island	Active	
**Ohio Zeta**	OH Z	February 20, 1954	University of Toledo	Toledo	Ohio	Active	
**Massachusetts Zeta**	MA Z	January 7, 1956	University of Massachusetts Amherst	Amherst	Massachusetts	Active	
**District of Columbia Alpha**	DC A	March 10, 1956	Howard University	Washington, D.C.	District of Columbia	Active	
**California Zeta**	CA Z	April 21, 1956	Santa Clara University	Santa Clara	California	Active	
**South Carolina Beta**	SC B	January 11, 1958	University of South Carolina	Columbia	South Carolina	Active	
**Vermont Alpha**	VT A	December 20, 1958	University of Vermont	Burlington	Vermont	Active	
**Ohio Eta**	OH H	February 21, 1959	Air Force Institute of Technology	Wright-Patterson AFB	Ohio	Active	
**Louisiana Delta**	LA D	March 5, 1960	University of Louisiana at Lafayette	Lafayette	Louisiana	Active	
**Indiana Gamma**	IN G	1960	University of Notre Dame	Notre Dame	Indiana	Active	
**Florida Alpha**	FL A	January 14, 1961	University of Florida	Gainesville	Florida	Active	
**Pennsylvania Theta**	PA Th	February 11, 1961	Villanova University	Villanova	Pennsylvania	Active	
**Ohio Theta**	OH Th	March 11, 1961	University of Dayton	Dayton	Ohio	Active	
**Texas Epsilon**	TX E	February 10, 1962	University of Houston	Houston	Texas	Active	
**District of Columbia Beta**	DC B	March 31, 1962	Catholic University of America	Washington, D.C.	District of Columbia	Active	
**District of Columbia Beta**	DC B	February 16, 1963	George Washington University	Washington, D.C.	District of Columbia	Active	
**Arizona Beta**	AZ B	March 9, 1963	Arizona State University	Tempe	Arizona	Active	
**Indiana Delta**	IN D	1963	Valparaiso University	Valparaiso	Indiana	Active	
**Illinois Delta**	IL D	January 18, 1964	Bradley University	Peoria	Illinois	Active	
**Florida Beta**	FL B	January 25, 1964	University of Miami	Coral Gables	Florida	Active	
**California Eta**	CA H	March 14, 1964	San Jose State University	San Jose	California	Active	
**Utah Beta**	UT B	April 4, 1964	Brigham Young University	Provo	Utah	Active	
**New York Mu**	NY M	April 11, 1964	Union College	Schenectady	New York	Active	
**California Theta**	CA Th	January 30, 1965	California State University, Long Beach	Long Beach	California	Active	
**Vermont Beta**	VT B	March 13, 1965	Norwich University	Northfield	Vermont	Active	
**Kansas Beta**	KS B	March 21, 1965	Wichita State University	Wichita	Kansas	Active	
**Washington Gamma**	WA G	February 12, 1966	Seattle University	Seattle	Washington	Active	
**California Iota**	CA I	February 18, 1967	California State University, Los Angeles	Los Angeles	California	Active	
**New York Nu**	NY N	March 11, 1967	University at Buffalo	Buffalo	New York	Active	
**New York Xi**	NY X	March 18, 1967	Manhattan University	Bronx	New York	Active	
**Tennessee Gamma**	TN G	February 3, 1968	Tennessee Technological University	Cookeville	Tennessee	Active	
**California Kappa**	CA K	February 17, 1968	California State University, Northridge	Northridge	California	Active	
**Texas Zeta**	TX Z	March 16, 1968	Lamar University	Beaumont	Texas	Active	
**Pennsylvania Iota**	PA I	March 30, 1968	Widener University	Chester	Pennsylvania	Active	
**Puerto Rico Alpha**	PR A	March 8, 1969	University of Puerto Rico, Mayagüez Campus	Mayaguez	Puerto Rico	Active	
**Mississippi Beta**	MS B	March 15, 1969	University of Mississippi	Oxford	Mississippi	Active	
**Texas Eta**	TX H	March 22, 1969	University of Texas at Arlington	Arlington	Texas	Active	
**Texas Theta**	TX Th	March 29, 1969	University of Texas at El Paso	El Paso	Texas	Active	
**California Lambda**	CA L	May 3, 1969	University of California, Davis	Davis	California	Active	
**New York Omicron**	NY O	April 26, 1970	Stony Brook University	Stony Brook	New York	Active	
**New York Pi**	NY P	January 23, 1971	Rochester Institute of Technology	Rochester	New York	Active	
**Oklahoma Beta**	OK B	February 13, 1971	University of Tulsa	Tulsa	Oklahoma	Active	
**Michigan Zeta**	MI Z	May 8, 1971	Kettering University	Flint	Michigan	Active	
**West Virginia Beta**	WV B	January 29, 1972	West Virginia University Institute of Technology	Beckley	West Virginia	Active	
**California Mu**	CA M	February 13, 1972	California Polytechnic State University, San Luis Obispo	San Luis Obispo	California	Active	
**California Nu**	CA N	February 13, 1972	California State Polytechnic University, Pomona	Pomona	California	Active	
**New Jersey Delta**	NJ D	April 23, 1972	Princeton University	Princeton	New Jersey	Active	
**California Xi**	CA X	March 4, 1973	San Diego State University	San Diego	California	Active	
**Wisconsin Gamma**	WI G	March 17, 1973	University of Wisconsin–Milwaukee	Milwaukee	Wisconsin	Active	
**Ohio Iota**	OH I	March 31, 1973	Ohio Northern University	Ada	Ohio	Active	
**Nebraska Alpha**	NE A	January 26, 1974	University of Nebraska–Lincoln	Lincoln	Nebraska	Active	
**Kansas Gamma**	KS G	January 27, 1974	Kansas State University	Manhattan	Kansas	Active	
**Florida Gamma**	FL G	February 16, 1974	University of South Florida	Tampa	Florida	Active	
**California Omicron**	CA O	March 9, 1974	Loyola Marymount University	Los Angeles	California	Active	
California Pi	CA P	March 10, 1974 – December 31, 1991	Northrop University	Inglewood	California	Inactive	(Note: Chapter went defunct when Northrop University sold and ended its bachelor's degree program.)
**Pennsylvania Kappa**	PA K	March 20, 1974	Swarthmore College	Swarthmore	Pennsylvania	Active	
**Pennsylvania Lambda**	PA L	March 21, 1974	University of Pittsburgh	Pittsburgh	Pennsylvania	Active	
**Kentucky Beta**	KY B	March 24, 1974	University of Louisville	Louisville	Kentucky	Active	
**Tennessee Delta**	TN D	March 30, 1974	Christian Brothers University	Memphis	Tennessee	Active	
**Texas Iota**	TX I	April 2, 1974	Southern Methodist University	Dallas	Texas	Active	
**Texas Kappa**	TX K	April 3, 1974	Prairie View A&M University	Prairie View	Texas	Active	
**Texas Lambda**	TX L	April 4, 1974	Texas A&M University-Kingsville	Kingsville	Texas	Active	
**New Mexico Alpha**	NM A	April 5, 1974	New Mexico State University	Las Cruces	New Mexico	Active	
**New Mexico Beta**	NM B	April 6, 1974	University of New Mexico	Albuquerque	New Mexico	Active	
**Oklahoma Gamma**	OK G	April 7, 1974	Oklahoma State University	Stillwater	Oklahoma	Active	
**Wyoming Alpha**	WY A	April 19, 1974	University of Wyoming	Laramie	Wyoming	Active	
**Colorado Delta**	CO D	April 20, 1974	Colorado State University	Fort Collins	Colorado	Active	
**South Dakota Alpha**	SD A	April 22, 1974	South Dakota School of Mines and Technology	Rapid City	South Dakota	Active	
**South Dakota Beta**	SD B	April 23, 1974	South Dakota State University	Brookings	South Dakota	Active	
**North Dakota Beta**	ND B	April 24, 1974	University of North Dakota	Grand Forks	North Dakota	Active	
**Idaho Alpha**	ID A	May 2, 1974	University of Idaho	Moscow	Idaho	Active	
**California Rho**	CA R	May 9, 1974	California State University, Fresno	Fresno	California	Active	
**Nevada Alpha**	NV A	May 10, 1974	University of Nevada, Reno	Reno	Nevada	Active	
**Utah Gamma**	UT G	May 11, 1974	Utah State University	Logan	Utah	Active	
**Ohio Kappa**	OH K	May 21, 1974	University of Akron	Akron	Ohio	Active	
**Ohio Lambda**	OH L	May 22, 1974	Youngstown State University	Youngstown	Ohio	Active	
**New York Rho**	NY R	May 26, 1974	Polytechnic University	Brooklyn	New York	Active	
**Indiana Epsilon**	IN E	February 22, 1975	Trine University	Angola	Indiana	Active	
**Alaska Alpha**	AK A	April 5, 1975	University of Alaska Fairbanks	Fairbanks	Alaska	Active	
**Massachusetts Eta**	MA H	April 19, 1975	Boston University	Boston	Massachusetts	Active	
**Illinois Epsilon**	IL E	April 3, 1976	Southern Illinois University at Carbondale	Carbondale	Illinois	Active	
**Alabama Gamma**	AL G	March 27, 1977	University of Alabama at Birmingham	Birmingham	Alabama	Active	
**Tennessee Epsilon**	TN E	April 2, 1977	University of Memphis	Memphis	Tennessee	Active	
**Florida Delta**	FL D	December 3, 1977	University of Central Florida	Orlando	Florida	Active	
**Michigan Eta**	MI H	February 11, 1978	Lawrence Technological University	Southfield	Michigan	Active	
**Michigan Theta**	MI Th	February 17, 1979	Oakland University	Rochester	Michigan	Active	
**Virginia Gamma**	VA G	March 17, 1979	Old Dominion University	Norfolk	Virginia	Active	
**North Carolina Delta**	NC D	March 23, 1979	University of North Carolina at Charlotte	Charlotte	North Carolina	Active	
**Alabama Delta**	AL D	January 26, 1980	University of Alabama in Huntsville	Huntsville	Alabama	Active	
**California Sigma**	CA S	January 24, 1981	University of California, Santa Barbara	Santa Barbara	California	Active	
**Arizona Gamma**	AZ G	March 7, 1981	Northern Arizona University	Flagstaff	Arizona	Active	
**South Carolina Gamma**	SC G	March 28, 1981	The Citadel	Charleston	South Carolina	Active	
**Michigan Iota**	MI I	January 16, 1982	University of Michigan–Dearborn	Dearborn	Michigan	Active	
**California Tau**	CA T	April 3, 1982	University of California, Irvine	Irvine	California	Active	
**Maryland Gamma**	MD G	January 13, 1984	United States Naval Academy	Annapolis	Maryland	Active	
**Illinois Zeta**	IL Z	January 28, 1984	University of Illinois at Chicago	Chicago	Illinois	Active	
**California Upsilon**	CA U	February 18, 1984	California State University, Sacramento	Sacramento	California	Active	
**Montana Beta**	MT B	March 24, 1984	Montana Technological University	Butte	Montana	Active	
**Florida Epsilon**	FL E	February 9, 1985	Florida Atlantic University	Boca Raton	Florida	Active	
**New Mexico Gamma**	NM G	March 2, 1985	New Mexico Institute of Mining and Technology	Socorro	New Mexico	Active	
**Massachusetts Theta**	MA Th	March 9, 1985	University of Massachusetts Lowell	Lowell	Massachusetts	Active	
**Colorado Epsilon**	CO E	November 23, 1985	University of Colorado at Denver	Denver	Colorado	Active	
**North Carolina Epsilon**	NC E	February 18, 1986	North Carolina Agricultural and Technical State University	Greensboro	North Carolina	Active	
**Florida Zeta**	FL Z	March 1, 1986	Florida Institute of Technology	Melbourne	Florida	Active	
**California Phi**	CA Ph	March 5, 1988	University of the Pacific	Stockton	California	Active	
**Michigan Kappa**	MI K	March 18, 1989	Western Michigan University	Kalamazoo	Michigan	Active	
**Tennessee Zeta**	TN Z	January 6, 1990	University of Tennessee at Chattanooga	Chattanooga	Tennessee	Active	
**Alabama Epsilon**	AL E	February 3, 1990	University of South Alabama	Mobile	Alabama	Active	
**Wisconsin Delta**	WI D	March 10, 1990	Milwaukee School of Engineering	Milwaukee	Wisconsin	Active	
**Ohio Mu**	OH M	May 5, 1990	Wright State University	Dayton	Ohio	Active	
**New York Sigma**	NY S	February 2, 1991	Alfred University	Alfred	New York	Active	
**Virginia Delta**	VA D	February 9, 1991	Virginia Military Institute	Lexington	Virginia	Active	
**Connecticut Gamma**	CT G	March 9, 1991	University of Hartford	West Hartford	Connecticut	Active	
**New York Tau**	NY T	March 16, 1991	Binghamton University	Binghamton	New York	Active	
**Wisconsin Epsilon**	WI E	February 1, 1992	University of Wisconsin–Platteville	Platteville	Wisconsin	Active	
**Florida Eta**	FL H	February 29, 1992	Florida A&M University and Florida State University	Tallahassee	Florida	Active	
**Massachusetts Iota**	MA I	March 21, 1992	Western New England College	Springfield	Massachusetts	Active	
**California Chi**	CA Ch	March 28, 1992	California State University, Fullerton	Fullerton	California	Active	
**Oregon Beta**	OR B	February 13, 1993	Portland State University	Portland	Oregon	Active	
**Louisiana Epsilon**	LA E	March 13, 1993	University of New Orleans	New Orleans	Louisiana	Active	
**Maryland Delta**	MD D	December 11, 1993	University of Maryland, Baltimore County	Baltimore	Maryland	Active	
**California Psi**	CA Ps	February 5, 1994	University of California, San Diego	San Diego	California	Active	
**Florida Theta**	FL Th	March 12, 1994	Florida International University	Miami	Florida	Active	
**Nevada Beta**	NV B	February 4, 1995	University of Nevada, Las Vegas	Las Vegas	Nevada	Active	
**Georgia Beta**	GA B	February 11, 1995	Mercer University	Macon	Georgia	Active	
**Washington Delta**	WA D	February 25, 1995	Gonzaga University	Spokane	Washington	Active	
**Minnesota Beta**	MN B	February 3, 1996	University of Minnesota Duluth	Duluth	Minnesota	Active	
**California Omega**	CA W	February 10, 1996	Harvey Mudd College	Claremont	California	Active	
**California Alpha Alpha**	CA A	March 2, 1996	California State University, Chico	Chico	California	Active	
**Colorado Zeta**	CO Z	March 8, 1997	United States Air Force Academy	Colorado Springs	Colorado	Active	
**Maryland Epsilon**	MD E	March 7, 1998	Morgan State University	Baltimore	Maryland	Active	
**Ohio Nu**	OH N	March 3, 2001	Cedarville University	Cedarville	Ohio	Active	
**Missouri Delta**	MO D	January 26, 2002	University of Missouri–Kansas City	Kansas City	Missouri	Active	
**Oregon Gamma**	OR G	February 9, 2002	University of Portland	Portland	Oregon	Active	
**New Hampshire Beta**	NH B	February 23, 2002	Dartmouth College	Hanover	New Hampshire	Active	
**Texas Mu**	TX M	March 3, 2002	University of Texas at San Antonio	San Antonio	Texas	Active	
**Virginia Epsilon**	VA E	March 1, 2003	Virginia Commonwealth University	Richmond	Virginia	Active	
**Idaho Beta**	ID B	January 17, 2004	Idaho State University	Pocatello	Idaho	Active	
**Michigan Lambda**	MI L	March 27, 2004	Grand Valley State University	Grand Rapids	Michigan	Active	
**California Alpha Beta**	CA A	February 12, 2005	University of California, Riverside	Riverside	California	Active	
**New Jersey Epsilon**	NJ E	January 28, 2006	Rowan University	Glassboro	New Jersey	Active	
**New York Upsilon**	NY U	February 10, 2007	United States Military Academy	West Point	New York	Active	
**California Alpha Gamma**	CA A	March 10, 2007	San Francisco State University	San Francisco	California	Active	
**California Alpha Delta**	CA A	February 9, 2008	University of California, Santa Cruz	Santa Cruz	California	Active	
**Ohio Xi**	OH X	February 23, 2008	Miami University	Oxford	Ohio	Active	
**Kentucky Gamma**	KY G	February 27, 2009	Western Kentucky University	Bowling Green	Kentucky	Active	
**Idaho Gamma**	ID G	March 13, 2010	Boise State University	Boise	Idaho	Active	
**Florida Iota**	FL I	March 12, 2011	Embry-Riddle Aeronautical University	Daytona Beach	Florida	Active	
**California Alpha Epsilon**	CA A	February 25, 2012	University of San Diego	San Diego	California	Active	
**Pennsylvania Mu**	PA M	January 26, 2013	Penn State Erie, The Behrend College	Erie	Pennsylvania	Active	
**New Jersey Eta**	NJ H	March 2, 2013	The College of New Jersey	Ewing Township	New Jersey	Active	
**Missouri Epsilon**	MO E	March 23, 2013	Saint Louis University	St. Louis	Missouri	Active	
**Texas Nu**	TX N	March 22, 2014	University of Texas Rio Grande Valley	Edinburg	Texas	Active	
**Indiana Zeta**	IN Z	March 28, 2015	Indiana University – Purdue University Indianapolis	Indianapolis	Indiana	Active	
**Arizona Delta**	AZ D	April 11, 2015	Embry–Riddle Aeronautical University, Prescott	Prescott	Arizona	Active	
**North Carolina Zeta**	NC Z	March 19, 2016	East Carolina University	Greenville	North Carolina	Active	
**Idaho Delta**	ID D	March 4, 2017	Brigham Young University-Idaho	Rexburg	Idaho	Active	
**Oregon Delta**	OR D	April 14, 2018	Oregon Institute of Technology	Klamath Falls	Oregon	Active	
**Texas Xi**	TX X	February 15, 2020	University of Texas at Dallas	Dallas	Texas	Active	
**Arkansas Beta**	AR B	March 7, 2020	University of Arkansas at Little Rock	Little Rock	Arkansas	Active	
**Georgia Gamma**	GA G	October 9, 2021	Georgia Southern University	Statesboro	Georgia	Active	
**Georgia Delta**	GA D	February 25, 2023	University of Georgia	Athens	Georgia	Active	
**Tennessee Eta**	TN H	March 4, 2023	Lipscomb University	Nashville	Tennessee	Active	
**North Carolina Eta**	NC H	March 18, 2023	Western Carolina University	Cullowhee	North Carolina	Active	
**Massachusetts Kappa**	MA K	March 25, 2023	Merrimack College	North Andover	Massachusetts	Active	
**Utah Delta**	UT D	April 30, 2027	Weber State University	Ogden	Utah	Pending	

== Alumni chapters ==
Following is a list of Tau Beta Pi alumni chapters, with active chapters indicated in bold and inactive chapters in italics.

Chapter	City	State or district	Status	Ref.
**Albuquerque, NM**	Albuquerque	New Mexico	Active	
Ames, IA	Ames	Iowa	Inactive	
**Ann Arbor Area, Michigan**	Ann Arbor	Michigan	Active	
**Atlanta, GA**	Atlanta	Georgia	Active	
**Baltimore, MD**	Baltimore	Maryland	Active	
Bluegrass	Frankfort and Lexington	Kentucky	Inactive	
Buffalo, NY	Buffalo	New York	Inactive	
Central Alabama	Birmingham	Alabama	Inactive	
**Central Connecticut**		Connecticut	Active	
**Central Florida**	Orlando	Florida	Active	
**Central Illinois**	Urbana and Champaign	Illinois	Active	
**Central Jersey**	Hillsborough Township	New Jersey	Active	
Central Michigan	Lansing	Michigan	Inactive	
**Central Texas**	Austin and San Antonio	Texas	Active	
**Charlotte, NC**	Charlotte	North Carolina	Active	
**Chicago, Illinois**	Chicago	Illinois	Active	
Cincinnati, OH	Cincinnati	Ohio	Inactive	
Columbia River Basin	Richland	Washington	Inactive	
**Columbus, OH**	Columbus	Ohio	Active	
**Dayton, OH**	Dayton	Ohio	Active	
Daytona Beach, FL	Daytona Beach	Florida	Inactive	
**El Paso, TX**	El Paso	Texas	Active	
Flint, MI	Flint	Michigan	Inactive	
**Front Range, CO/WY**	Denver	Colorado	Active	
Gainesville, FL	Gainesville	Florida	Inactive	
**Great Smoky Mountains**	Knoxville and Oak Ridge	Tennessee	Active	
**Greater Boston Area, MA**	Boston	Massachusetts	Active	
Greater Gulf Coast	Mobile	Alabama	Inactive	
**Greater New Orleans, LA**	New Orleans	Louisiana	Active	
**Greater San Diego, CA**	San Diego	California	Active	
Hampton Roads, Newport News, VA	Hampton Roads and Newport News	Virginia	Inactive	
**Indianapolis, IN**	Indianapolis	Indiana	Active	
Kanawha Valley	Charleston	West Virginia	Inactive	
**Kansas City**	Kansas City	Missouri	Active	
Lehigh Valley	Bethlehem	Pennsylvania	Inactive	
Long Island, NY Suburban	Long Island	New York	Inactive	
**Los Angeles, CA**	Los Angeles	California	Active	
**Louisville, KY**	Louisville	Kentucky	Active	
Miami, FL	Miami	Florida	Inactive	
Midlands	Columbia	South Carolina	Inactive	
**Mid-South**	Memphis	Tennessee	Active	
**Milwaukee Area, WI**	Milwaukee	Wisconsin	Active	
**Minnesota, Twin Cities,**	Minneapolis	Minnesota	Active	
New York Capital District, NY	Albany	New York	Inactive	
**New York City, NY**	New York City	New York	Active	
Newark, NJ	Newark	New Jersey	Inactive	
**North Texas**	Dallas–Fort Worth	Texas	Active	
**Ohio's North Coast**	Cleveland	Ohio	Active	
**Orange County, CA**	Orange County	California	Active	
**Palm Beach/Broward, FL**	Palm Beach	Florida	Active	
Philadelphia, PA	Philadelphia	Pennsylvania	Inactive	
**Phoenix, AZ**	Phoenix	Arizona	Active	
Piedmont	Clemson	South Carolina	Inactive	
**Pikes Peak**	Colorado Springs	Colorado	Active	
**Pioneer**		Oklahoma	Active	
**Pittsburgh, PA**	Pittsburgh	Pennsylvania	Active	
**Portland, OR**	Portland	Oregon	Active	
Puerto Rico		Puerto Rico	Inactive	
**Puget Sound**	Seattle	Washington	Active	
**Research Triangle**	Raleigh, Durham, and Chapel Hill	North Carolina	Active	
**Richmond, VA**	Richmond	Virginia	Active	
**Rochester, NY**	Rochester	New York	Active	
**Rocket City**	Huntsville	Alabama	Active	
Rolla, MO	Rolla	Missouri	Inactive	
**Sacramento Valley, CA**	Sacramento	California	Active	
Salt Lake City, UT	Salt Lake City	Utah	Inactive	
**San Francisco Bay Area, CA**	San Francisco	California	Active	
San Francisco Peninsula	Palo Alto	California	Inactive	
**Southeastern Michigan**	Detroit	Michigan	Active	
Southern California		California	Inactive	
Southern Tier	Binghamton	New York	Inactive	
**Southwest Florida**		Florida	Active	
**St. Louis, MO**	St. Louis	Missouri	Active	
Sun City, AZ	Sun City	Arizona	Inactive	
**Tampa Bay, FL**	Tampa	Florida	Active	
**Texas Gulf Coast**	Houston	Texas	Active	
Treasure Valley	Boise	Idaho	Inactive	
**Tucson, AZ**	Tucson	Arizona	Active	
**Washington, D.C.**	Washington, D.C.	District of Columbia	Active	
**West Michigan**	Grand Rapids	Michigan	Active	
Wilmington, DE	Wilmington	Delaware	Inactive	
