= Xiaolin Zheng =

Chinese-American engineer and nanoscientist

Xiaolin Zheng is a Chinese and American engineer and nanoscientist. Her research combines themes of combustion, nanomaterials, and energy, and has included fast combustion-based fabrication of nanoscale oxides, the application of flame-synthesized nanowires in catalytic converters and in water splitting, high energy density aluminum/graphene oxide fuels for aerospace and munitions propulsion applications, and the development of flexible solar cells and flexible electronics. She works at Stanford University as a professor of mechanical engineering and of energy science engineering, as a senior fellow at the Precourt Institute for Energy, and as associate dean for faculty affairs.

== Education and career ==
Zheng is originally from Anshan. She studied thermal engineering at Tsinghua University, graduating with a bachelor's degree in 2000. She continued her education in the Department of Mechanical and Aerospace Engineering at Princeton University, where she completed her Ph.D. in 2006. Her dissertation, Studies on ignition of hydrogen and hydrocarbons, was supervised by Chung K. Law.

After postdoctoral research in chemistry and chemical biology at Harvard University, she joined Stanford University as an assistant professor of mechanical engineering in 2007. She was promoted to associate professor in 2014, and to full professor in 2020.

== Recognition ==
Zheng is a 2009 recipient of the Presidential Early Career Award for Scientists and Engineers.
