= Jonathan F. Earle =

Jamaican-American engineering academic

Dr. Jonathan Earle
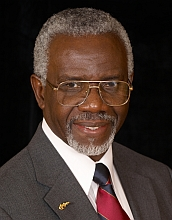
- Born: Jamaica
- Died: June 2, 2022
- Education: University of Florida
- Known for: Associate Dean for the College of Engineering at UF
- Awards: NSF Presidential Award for Excellence in Science, Mathematics and Engineering Mentoring
- Scientific career
- Fields: Engineering
- Workplaces: University of Florida

Jonathan F.K. Earle completed his Ph.D. at the University of Florida in 1985, and joined the faculty in the Department of Agricultural & Biological Engineering in 1987. He was appointed Assistant Dean for Student Affairs at the University of Florida College of Engineering in 1992. This position was later upgraded to Associate Dean. He remained in this position until his retirement in December, 2007. He now holds the title "Associate Dean Emeritus".

In this position, he created the Engineering Student Services Center to provide advising, resources and academic support to engineering students. He is perhaps best known, though, for his dedication to increasing the retention and graduation rates of minority students in engineering disciplines. In 1993 he implemented the STEPUP program (Successful Transition through Enhanced Preparation for Undergraduate Programs), based on the Meyerhoff model. STEPUP provides an intensive 6-week residential program for selected students and includes peer mentoring, academic preparation in calculus and chemistry, as well as industry networking opportunities. In 2000 - 2001, he was responsible for the implementation of EFTP (Engineering Freshman Transition Program), which provided a nonresidential experience open to all engineering freshman, as well as the Engineering GatorTrax Math Excellence Program, which was designed to provide hands-on applications of classroom mathematics concepts to middle and high school students in the state of Florida. He also implemented the Gator Engineering Outreach Program.

In 2007 he received the National Science Foundation Presidential Award for Excellence in Science, Mathematics and Engineering Mentoring.

Earle was elected to the National Executive Council of Tau Beta Pi engineering honor society in 2006, where he is currently expanding the GatorTrax model to a national level under the name MindSET.

== Education ==
Earle received both his Masters and Doctorate (1985) from the University of Florida.
