= Balakumar Balachandran =

Indian-American applied mathematician

- Born: February 4, 1963 (age 63); Nellore, Andhra Pradesh, India
- Citizenship: U.S.
- Education: Virginia Polytechnic Institute and State University (Virginia Tech)
- Known for: Nonlinear dynamics, vibrations, and data-driven approaches
- Awards: J.P. Den Hartog Award, Lyapunov Award, and Melville Award from the American Society of Mechanical Engineers, Robert H. Scanlan Medal from the American Society of Civil Engineers, Pendray Literature Award from the American Institute of Aeronautics and Astronautics

Balakumar "Bala" Balachandran is an Indian-American mechanician and applied mathematician recognized for his contributions to the fields of nonlinear dynamics, experimental methodologies, and data-driven approaches. He is a Minta Martin Professor and Distinguished University Professor at the University of Maryland, College Park, where he served as Chair of the Department of Mechanical Engineering from 2011 to 2023.

Balachandran has been recognized with the J.P. Den Hartog Award and the Lyapunov Award from the American Society of Mechanical Engineers for his lifetime contributions to these fields, and has published 3 books on vibrations and nonlinear dynamics.

== Education and career ==
Bala Balachandran was born in the city of Nellore in Andhra Pradesh, India on February 4, 1963. He received his B.Tech. degree in Naval Architecture from the Indian Institute of Technology, Madras, India, in 1985, and his M.S. in Aerospace Engineering from the Virginia Polytechnic Institute and State University (now Virginia Tech) in 1986. He completed his Ph.D. in Engineering Mechanics from Virginia Polytechnic Institute and State University in 1990 under the guidance of Ali H. Nayfeh. In 1993 he became an Assistant Professor of Mechanical Engineering at the University of Maryland, where he received tenure in 1998 and was promoted to Full Professor in 2003. After serving as Associate Chair and Director of Graduate Studies from 2006 to 2010, and as Acting Chair from 2010-2011, he became Chair of the department in 2011. He was named a Minta Martin Professor in 2012 and Distinguished University Professor in 2022.

== Research ==
Balachandran's research spans the fields of applied mathematics, applied physics, mechanics, dynamics, control, and system identification, with an emphasis on the analysis and application of nonlinear phenomena and nonlinear dynamics in diverse systems ranging from rotating machinery, vehicle systems, and space structures to disease dynamics.

== Awards ==
Balachandran's contributions have been recognized with honors including the 2023 Pendray Aerospace Literature Award from the American Institute of Aeronautics and Astronautics, the 2022 Robert H. Scanlan Medal from the American Society of Civil Engineers, the 2021 J.P. Den Hartog Award from the American Society of Mechanical Engineers, and the 2021 Lyapunov Award from the American Society of Mechanical Engineers. He is also a recipient of the 2016 Melville Award from the American Society of Mechanical Engineers, and the 2015 Hind Rattan Award bestowed by the NRI Welfare Society of India.

He is a member of diverse professional societies including the American Society of Mechanical Engineers, the American Society of Civil Engineers, and the American Institute of Aeronautics and Astronautics, the Royal Aeronautical Society, and the International Society for Nonlinear Dynamics. He is a Fellow of the American Society of Mechanical Engineers, American Institute of Aeronautics and Astronautics, and the Royal Aeronautical Society of the United Kingdom.
