= Henry J. Kelley =

American aerospace, ocean and computer engineer

Henry J. Kelley (1926-1988) was Christopher C. Kraft Professor of Aerospace and Ocean Engineering at the Virginia Polytechnic Institute. He produced major contributions to control theory, especially in aeronautical engineering and flight optimization.

In 1948, he received a Bachelor of Science from NYU in aeronautical engineering, and began to work for Grumman Aircraft in the same year. His studies continued as a part-time student leading to a Master of Science in mathematics (1951) and to the Sc.D. in aeronautical engineering (1958). In 1963, he left Grumman (as Assistant Chief of the Research Department) and founded Analytical Mechanics Associates with two partners. In 1978, he became a professor in the Aerospace and Ocean Engineering Department at the Virginia Polytechnic Institute.

His paper on "Gradient Theory of Optimal Flight Paths" (1960) is considered a major contribution to the field. In the context of control theory, Kelley derived basics of backpropagation, now widely used for machine learning and artificial neural networks.

Kelley received NYU's Founder's Day Award in 1959, the IAS New York Section Award in 1961, the AIAA Guidance and Control of Flight Award in 1973, and the AIAA Pendray Aerospace Literature Award in 1979. He was a Fellow of the AIAA, and member of the AAS, the IEEE and SIAM, and founder and first chairman of IFAC's Mathematics of Control Committee.
