= Nonlinear Dynamics (journal) =

- Discipline: Chaos theory, engineering
- Language: English
- Edited by: Walter Lacarbonara

Publication details
- History: Since 1990
- Publisher: Springer Science+Business Media
- Frequency: Semimonthly
- Open access: Hybrid
- Impact factor: 5.7 (2025)

Standard abbreviations
- ISO 4: Nonlinear Dyn.

Indexing
- ISSN: 0924-090X (print); 1573-269X (web)
- LCCN: 94660702
- OCLC no.: 634426729

Links
- Journal homepage; Online archive

Nonlinear Dynamics is a semimonthly peer-reviewed scientific journal covering all aspects of research on nonlinear phenomena in engineering and applied sciences. The journal is published by Springer Science+Business Media. The editor-in-chief is Walter Lacarbonara (Sapienza University of Rome).

== Related activities ==
=== NODYCON conference series ===
Selected papers presented at the NODYCON (Nonlinear Dynamics Conference), a biennial international conference on nonlinear dynamics in engineering systems, have been published in special issues of the journal.

=== Cassyni seminars ===
Selected articles have been featured in Cassyni, an online seminar platform for discussions of published research work.

== Abstracting and indexing ==
The journal is abstracted and indexed in:

- Current Contents/Engineering, Computing & Technology
- EBSCO databases
- Ei Compendex
- Inspec
- ProQuest databases
- Science Citation Index Expanded
- Scopus
- zbMATH (1997–2025)

According to the Journal Citation Reports, the journal has a 2025 impact factor of 5.7.
