= Josette Bellan =

Romanian-French-American fluid dynamicist

Josette Bellan (née Rosentweig) is a Romanian-French-American aerospace engineer and fluid dynamicist known for her research on turbulence in high-pressure reactions, and on the interactions between fluid dynamics and thermodynamics in these reactions. She is a senior research scientist at the Jet Propulsion Laboratory (JPL) and visiting associate in the Department of Mechanical and Civil Engineering of the California Institute of Technology (Caltech).

== Education and career ==
Bellan is originally from Romania, and grew up under the communist government there. She was educated in France, earning a baccalauréat in 1964 after studying at the Lycée Jules-Ferry (Paris), and a master's degree in 1969 at the Paris University of Sciences.

She and her family visited Princeton University on a vacation in 1969, and she and her twin sister Larisse (who died in 1980) were encouraged to apply to Princeton for graduate study. They did, becoming the second and third women graduate students in Princeton's engineering school, after Genevieve Segol, a civil and geological engineer who also came to Princeton from France, and the first women in Princeton's graduate program in aerospace and mechanical engineering. At Princeton, the twins were supported by Zonta International through Amelia Earhart Fellowships, and their arrival at Princeton was reported in The New York Times and French newspapers. She earned another master's degree at Princeton in 1972, and, with her sister, completed her Ph.D. in 1974. Her dissertation was A Theory of Turbulent Combustion and Nitric Oxide Formation for Dual-carbureted Stratified-charge Engines, supervised by William Sirignano.

After continuing at Princeton as a postdoctoral researcher, Bellan joined the Jet Propulsion Laboratory in 1978. She was a lecturer in jet propulsion at Caltech in 1992, became a visiting associate there in 1995, and was Chancellor's Distinguished Lecturer at the University of California, Irvine from 1995 to 1996. She became a senior research scientist at JPL in 1997.

She is a citizen of both France and the United States.

== Research ==
Bellan's research involves the simulation of reacting mixtures, and has shown the importance in these simulations of combining the effects of both fluid motion and heat transfer, down to the smallest levels of scale. Applications of this work include the development of bio-fuels, improving combustion efficiency in ground and aerospace vehicles and their effects on climate change, understanding the atmosphere of Venus, and modeling the interaction of rocket plumes with the surface of the Moon.

== Privacy activism ==
A 2004 policy of the Bush Administration, Homeland Security Presidential Directive 12, led NASA to require background checks on scientists at JPL. Bellan became part of a group of JPL employees who filed a lawsuit in 2007 against the policy, claiming that the checks into her personal life were too intrusive and harmed the collegial atmosphere of JPL, that as contract employees rather than government employees they should not be subject to the same checks required of people who performed classified research, and that this sort of government intrusiveness, typical of the communist regime that Bellan grew up under, was inappropriate for a democracy. The case, NASA v. Nelson, went to the Supreme Court of the United States in 2010, but the court upheld the government policy.

After the loss, some employees left JPL, but Bellan remained and submitted her background information. It was rejected because she included a note stating that she was submitting the information under duress, and she was required to submit it a second time without the note. In a related incident in 2012, a NASA laptop containing the background check information and other personal information of approximately 10,0000 employees was stolen from an employee's car, and a representative of the employees from the previous suit announced plans to sue NASA over its incautious handling of their information. The issue continued to simmer through 2014, when Bellan and another dual-national researcher from Ireland were required to sign a loyalty oath to the US, which they argued went well beyond the requirements of the 2004 policy. After an intervention by congresswoman Judy Chu, the requirement was modified.

== Recognition ==
In 2014, JPL gave Bellan their highest research award, the Magellan Award for Excellence, for her methods for simulating mixtures of particles and supercritical fluids. The American Institute of Aeronautics and Astronautics (AIAA) gave her their 2018 Pendray Aerospace Literature Award, "for widely reaching, seminal and outstanding publications on bio-fuels, sprays and high pressure flows to meet future challenges of Aeronautics and Astronautics combustion systems".

She was named a Fellow of the American Society of Mechanical Engineers in 1988, and a Fellow of the American Institute of Aeronautics and Astronautics in 2008. She became a Fellow of The Combustion Institute in 2021, "for establishing fundamental models of turbulent multi-phase phenomena with the models relying on fluid mechanics coupled to non-equilibrium thermodynamics and chemistry".
