= Ali H. Nayfeh =

Palestinian-Jordanian engineer specialising in non-linear dynamics

Ali Hasan Nayfeh
- Born: 21 December 1933; Tulkarm, Mandatory Palestine
- Died: 27 March 2017 (aged 83); Amman, Jordan
- Education: Stanford University
- Awards: Thomas K. Caughey Dynamics Award (2008); Benjamin Franklin Medal in Mechanical Engineering (2014)
- Scientific career
- Fields: Aerodynamics, structural dynamics, perturbation methods, nonlinear dynamics, aeroelasticity, nonlinear control, MEMS, NEMS, and chaos theory
- Thesis: Generalized Method for Treating Singular Perturbation Problems (1964)
- Doctoral advisor: Milton Van Dyke

Ali Hasan Nayfeh (Arabic: علي نايفة) (21 December 1933 – 27 March 2017) was a Palestinian-Jordanian mathematician, mechanical engineer and physicist. He is regarded as the most influential scholar and scientist in the area of applied nonlinear dynamics in mechanics and engineering. He was the inaugural winner of the Thomas K. Caughey Dynamics Award, and was awarded the Benjamin Franklin Medal in mechanical engineering. His pioneering work in nonlinear dynamics has been influential in the construction and maintenance of machines and structures that are common in daily life, such as ships, cranes, bridges, buildings, skyscrapers, jet engines, rocket engines, aircraft and spacecraft.

== Biography ==
Ali Hasan Nayfeh was born on 21 December 1933, in the neighborhood of Shweikeh in Tulkarem city, in Mandatory Palestine. He was born to an illiterate and poor Palestinian family, who encouraged him to pursue education. He worked as a mathematics teacher at towns and villages in Jordan for ten years, up until he won a scholarship at the age of 26 to study at Stanford University in the United States.

Nayfeh received his B.S. with great distinction in engineering science (1962) and his M.S. (1963) and PhD (1964) in aeronautics and astronautics from Stanford University. His PhD dissertation described a method for dealing with perturbation problems. He was a University Distinguished Professor of engineering at Virginia Tech since 1976. He was a volunteer at the University of Jordan. He was the editor-in-chief of Nonlinear Dynamics. He was editor-in-chief of the Journal of Vibration and Control from 1995 until his resignation in May 2014.

He held honorary doctorates from Marine Technical University (Russia), Technical University of Munich (Germany), and Politechnika Szczecińska (Poland).

He died on 27 March 2017.

== Contributions ==
In a career spanning four decades, he made important contributions to a number of fields, including perturbation techniques, nonlinear oscillations, aerodynamics, flight mechanics, acoustics, ship motions, hydrodynamic stability, nonlinear waves, structural dynamics, experimental dynamics, linear and nonlinear control, and micromechanics, and fluid dynamics. He authored over a thousand publications, which have collectively been cited at least 43,364 times by other scholars, as of 2017. His contributions have had a significant influence on the lives of many people.

His contributions in nonlinear dynamics have had an impact on numerous practical applications, including devices, structures and systems that are common in daily life. His pioneering work in nonlinear dynamics, mainly focused on finding stability and predictability in what may appear to be chaos, has been influential and widely adopted by various industries for the construction and maintenance of safe, reliable machines and structures, such as ships, cranes, bridges, buildings, skyscrapers, jet engines, rocket engines, aircraft and spacecraft.

== Professional memberships ==
Nayfeh was a fellow of the American Physical Society, the American Institute of Aeronautics and Astronautics, the American Society of Mechanical Engineers, the Society of Design and Process Science, and the American Academy of Mechanics.

== Awards ==
Nayfeh received the Pendray Aerospace Literature Award from the American Institute of Aeronautics and Astronautics in 1995; the J. P. Den Hartog Award from the American Society of Mechanical Engineers in 1997; the Frank J. Maher Award for Excellence in Engineering Education in 1997; the Lyapunov Award from the American Society of Mechanical Engineers in 2005; the Virginia Academy of Science's Life Achievement in Science Award in 2005; the Gold Medal of Honor from the Academy of Trans-Disciplinary Learning and Advanced Studies in 2007; and the Thomas K. Caughey Dynamics Award in 2008. In 2014, Nayfeh was awarded the Benjamin Franklin Medal in mechanical engineering.

Nayfeh gives his name to two awards offered by the International Society of Nonlinear Dynamics (NODYS), the Ali H. Nayfeh Senior Award and the Ali H. Nayfeh Early Career Award, to recognize senior and young researchers who have made significant contributions to the field of nonlinear dynamics.

== Publications ==
=== Books ===
- Ali H. Nayfeh, Dean T. Mook (1979). Nonlinear Oscillations. John Wiley & Sons.
- Ali H. Nayfeh (1993). The Method of Normal Forms. John Wiley & Sons.
- Ali H. Nayfeh (1993). Introduction to Perturbation Techniques. John Wiley & Sons.
- Ali H. Nayfeh, Balakumar Balachandran (1995). Applied Nonlinear Dynamics: Analytical, Computational and Experimental Methods. John Wiley & Sons. Bibcode:1995anda.book.....N.
- Ali H. Nayfeh (2000). Perturbation methods. John Wiley & Sons.
- Ali H. Nayfeh (2000). Nonlinear Interactions: Analytical, Computational, and Experimental Methods. John Wiley & Sons.
- Ali H. Nayfeh, P. Frank Pai (2004). Linear and Nonlinear Structural Mechanics. John Wiley & Sons.
