= James Nobel Landis =

American power engineer (1899–1989)

- Born: August 15, 1899; Champaign, Illinois
- Died: April 29, 1989 (aged 89)
- Education: University of Michigan
- Scientific career
- Workplaces: Brooklyn Edison Company; Bechtel Corporation

James Nobel Landis (August 15, 1899 – April 29, 1989) was an American power engineer, at the Brooklyn Edison Company, and later the Bechtel Corporation. He is known as a founding member of the National Academy of Engineering, and as president of the American Society of Mechanical Engineers in the year 1958–59.

== Biography ==
=== Youth, education and early career ===
Landis was born in Champaign, Illinois, received his B.S. in mechanical engineering from the University of Michigan (1922), and after graduating began employment at the Brooklyn Edison Company as a mechanical engineer.

From 1929 to 1932, he administered the civil, structural, and mechanical engineering of all Brooklyn Edison generating stations, which at that time included the world's largest generating plant. In 1932 he was put in charge of all civil, structural, and mechanical design for the company, and when it combined with Metropolitan Electric Utilities to form Consolidated Edison, he carried over these duties plus those for electrical crafting of all power installations in the combined system. Under his direction, the company converted from older direct current and 25-cycle alternating current to the modern American 60-cycle alternating current, and adopted high-pressure steam turbines.

=== Later career ===
In 1948 Landis joined the Bechtel Corporation as chief power engineer, and in 1951 when Bechtel and several utility companies created a preliminary power plant design, Landis was a key participant. In 1953 he became a vice-president of Bechtel.

In 1955 construction began on a Commonwealth Edison plant with General Electric reactor and Bechtel supplying the remainder of the installation. Landis retired from active management in 1964 but continued consulting until 1974.

Landis was active in professional societies and published a number of papers. He was elected an honorary member of the American Society of Mechanical Engineers (ASME) in 1964. He received other honors including the ASME's James N. Landis Medal (1977), named in his honor and the Franklin Institute's Newcomen Medal (1978).
