= Tau Beta Pi =

Engineering honor society

- ΤΒΠ
- Founded: June 15, 1885; 141 years ago Lehigh University
- Type: Honor
- Affiliation: ACHS
- Status: Active
- Emphasis: Engineering
- Scope: International
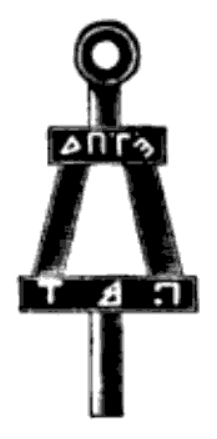
- Member badge
- Colors: Seal Brown and White
- Publication: The Bent; The Bulletin
- Chapters: 255 active
- Members: 635,563 lifetime
- Headquarters: 508 Dougherty Engineering Building; 1512 Middle Drive; Knoxville, Tennessee 37996; United States
- Website: www.tbp.org

The Tau Beta Pi Association (commonly Tau Beta Pi, ΤΒΠ, or TBP) is the oldest engineering honor society and the second oldest collegiate honor society in the United States. It honors engineering students in American universities who have shown a history of academic achievement as well as a commitment to personal and professional integrity. Specifically, the association was founded "to mark in a fitting manner those who have conferred honor upon their Alma Mater by distinguished scholarship and exemplary character as students in engineering, or by their attainments as alumni in the field of engineering, and to foster a spirit of liberal culture in engineering colleges".

== History ==
When academic honor society Phi Beta Kappa sought to restrict its membership to students of the liberal arts in the late 19th century, Edward H. Williams Jr., a member of Phi Beta Kappa and head of the mining department at Lehigh University, formulated the idea of an honor society for those studying technical subjects. Williams formed Tau Beta Pi in June 1885. Irving Andrew Heikes, the valedictorian of his class at Lehigh, was initiated as the first student member of Tau Beta Pi on June 15, 1885. A statue on Lehigh's campus commemorates this event.

In 1892, a second chapter was established at Michigan State University. Since then, the association has grown to 257 collegiate chapters across the United States and Puerto Rico. Tau Beta Pi was a founding member of the Association of College Honor Societies. The national headquarters of Tau Beta Pi is located in Knoxville, Tennessee on the campus of the University of Tennessee.

Although Tau Beta Pi never discriminated on the basis of race or religion, Tau Beta Pi did make its start as a male-only society. Female engineering students were scholastically eligible for Tau Beta Pi as early as 1902; however, those women were not granted membership. Starting in 1936, TBP awarded a "women's badge" to exceptional female engineering students, and a total of 619 women's badges were awarded until 1969. In 1969, Tau Beta Pi began granting women full membership in the society.

In 1974, the Sigma Tau fraternity merged with Tau Beta Pi. Sigma Tau was an honor society for engineering much like Tau Beta Pi and was founded at the University of Nebraska in 1904. At the time of the merger, Sigma Tau consisted of 34 collegiate chapters and a total membership of 45,000. The basis of the merger of Tau Beta Pi and Sigma Tau was the conviction that a single, strong honor society would better serve the engineering profession. Tau Beta Pi awardees are not normally considered for membership in Phi Beta Kappa, and vice versa, owing to differences in the subjects for demonstrating distinction emphasized by each society. The honor they confer is equivalent.

In 2011, the society had 237 active chapters, sixty alumni clubs, and 526,414 total initiates,

== Symbols ==
The official badge, called the Bent, is a watch key in the shape of the bent of a trestle. The trestle is the load-bearing part of the bridge, representing Tau Beta Pi's principle of Integrity and Excellence In Engineering. Originally, the keys could be used to wind watches. However, because watches have since been fabricated with their own winding mechanisms, modern keys do not have this ability. When using the Bent, members must adhere to strict guidelines regarding the exact dimensions of the trestle in order for the Bent to be a valid representation. The symbols on the Bent at the top and the bottom are an ancient form of Greek letters.

The colors of Tau Beta Pi are seal brown and white, which are the school colors of Lehigh. The quarterly magazine of Tau Beta Pi is also titled The Bent.

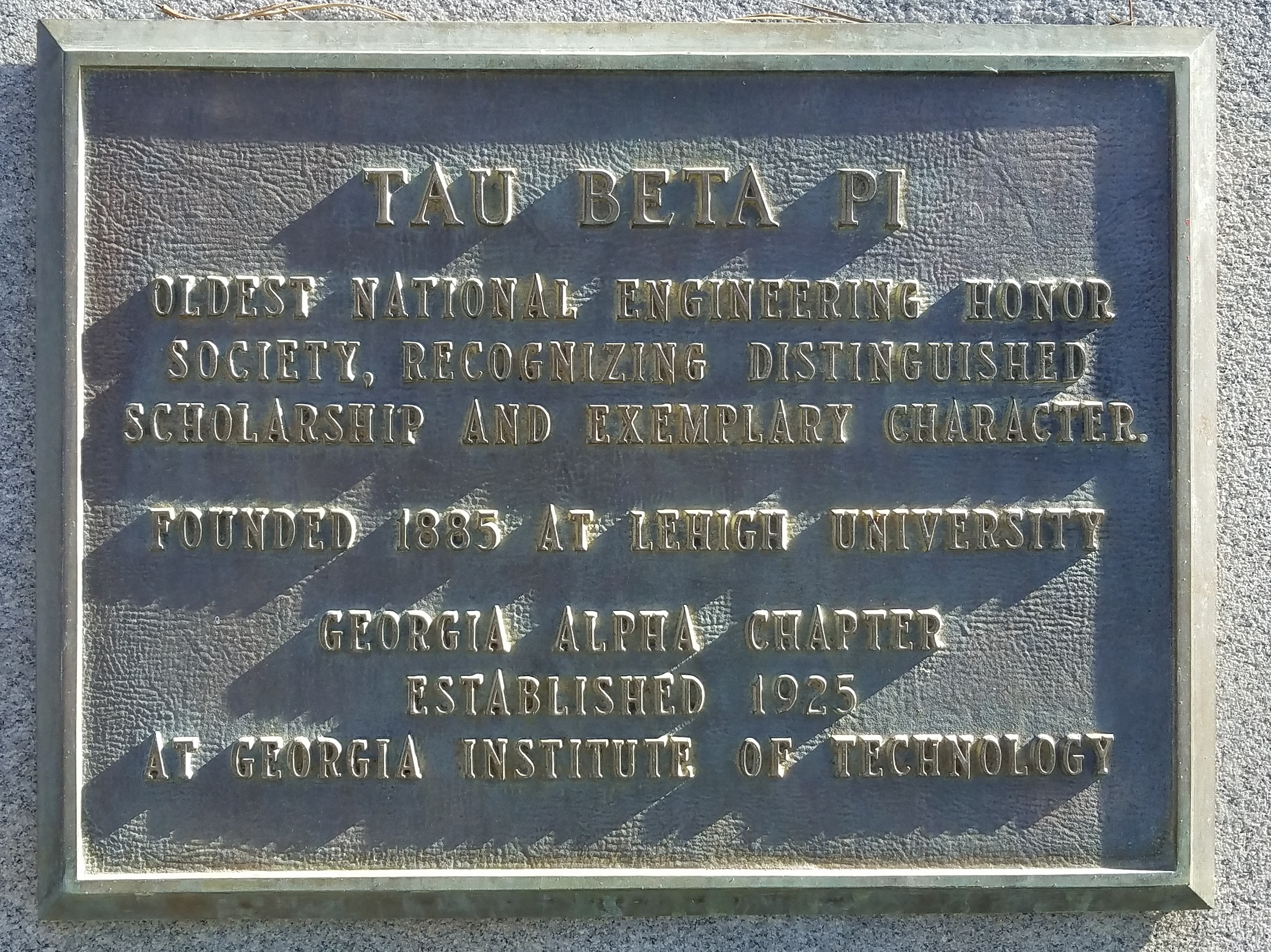
Plaque recognizing the Georgia Tech chapter of Tau Beta Pi

The logo of Tau Beta Pi was revised and approved at the 2019 Convention in Columbus, Ohio. The new logo features the Bent inside a circle, with the words "Tau Beta Pi / The Engineering Honor Society" either to the right or underneath the symbol and is available in either blue or seal brown on a white background. The old logo, which featured a tilted 3D Bent and the words "Tau Beta Pi / The Engineering Honor Society" in a lighter blue color was discontinued in October 2019. A logo for Pi Day was developed in 2016 and features a black seal with white text "Tau Beta Pi / The Engineering Honor Society / Pi Day" centered around the image of the bent in the middle. The digits of pi wrap around the edge of the seal.

The Creed of Tau Beta Pi is "Integrity and Excellence in Engineering".

== Chapters ==
There are 261 chartered Tau Beta Pi Collegiate Chapters; 255 are active, 6 are inactive.

== Membership ==
There is now only one "class" of members in Tau Beta Pi, the former classifications of Member with Distinction, Honorary Member, and Associate Member having been discontinued. Election to membership in the association is accomplished only by vote of a collegiate chapter, and members' chapter designations are always those of the chapters that elected them. Members' class numerals are those of the years in which they received the engineering degrees on which their eligibility was based, although members with no engineering degree are designated by the year in which they were initiated. Candidates eligible for consideration for election to membership by a collegiate chapter fall into five general categories:

1. Undergraduate students.
2. Graduate students.
3. Alumni of the chapter's institution who were eligible as students.
4. Alumni of other institutions who were eligible as students.
5. Engineers of high attainment in the profession, regardless of college attended, scholastic record, or educational background.

=== Undergraduate eligibility requirements ===
Undergraduate students whose scholarship places them in the top eighth of their engineering class in their next-to-last year or in the top fifth of their engineering class in their last college year are eligible for membership consideration. These scholastically eligible students are further considered on the basis of personal integrity, breadth of interest both inside and outside engineering, adaptability, and unselfish activity. At least 50% of a student's coursework must have been completed by the time of their invitation to the society. Students must be pursuing at least one major within their college's engineering school; for this reason, some Computer Science students may or may not be eligible for membership depending on if Computer Science is counted in the engineering school or the liberal arts school at their respective university, for example. Some chapters may set a scholastic-grade deadline below which candidates are not considered, such deadline being higher than that required as a minimum by the Constitution. Elections and initiations are normally held twice a year, in the fall/winter or spring terms of the chapter's institution. Student electees who are financially unable to meet the initiation-fee obligation may make delayed payment arrangements with their chapters, may borrow from the association's loan fund, or may accept election but postpone initiation for up to five years.

=== Graduate eligibility requirements ===
Engineering graduate students whose scholarship places them in the top fifth of their graduate class and have completed at least 50% of their coursework or whose high-quality work is attested to by a faculty member may be elected to membership. Engineering alumni of a chapter's institution or of another recognized institution whose scholastic record placed them in the top fifth of their class may be elected to membership. Such candidates are usually recommended to the chapter by a member who knows them. In all cases the requisite scholastic attainment makes candidates eligible for membership consideration. They are further considered on the basis of the association's exemplary character requirement.

=== Eminent engineer eligibility requirements ===
Persons who have achieved eminence in engineering may be elected to membership without regard to collegiate records. If they graduated from a recognized engineering college, they must have been engaged in engineering for at least 10 years; if not, they must have practiced engineering for at least 15 years. Such candidates are usually recommended by members who know them. The required degree of eminent achievement is left to the chapters' discretion; and candidates are further considered on the basis of exemplary character.

=== Historical requirements ===
Prior to the fall of 1941, Tau Beta Pi's scholastic requirements were that eligible candidates stand in the top eighth of the junior class, but in the top quarter of the senior class. The classes graduating in 1942 were thus the first to be admitted under the higher requirement. Until 1969, membership in Tau Beta Pi was limited to men, although qualified women were offered an award called the Women's Badge. From its authorization in 1936 until its elimination by the admission of women to membership, 619 Women's Badges were awarded by 98 chapters. Those women later were offered full membership by their chapters after Tau Beta Pi initiated its first female members in 1969.

=== Membership verification ===
Tau Beta Pi membership catalogs were published in 1898, 1911, 1916, 1926, 1932, and 1939. The 1946 Convention authorized discontinuance of them because of the excessive cost and limited usefulness. Today, membership can be verified online.

=== Membership benefits ===
Tau Beta Pi members gain access to a variety of benefits for life after initiation, including access to applying for $2000 scholarships for rising seniors (about 50% acceptance rate) and $10,000 fellowships for graduate students (about 10% acceptance rate), a private LinkedIn group of alumni, the opportunity to attend the annual national convention (with sponsored travel for voting delegates) and participate in a Tau Beta Pi-only recruiting fair, and graduation stoles and cords for members in good standing during their graduation. Members also receive automatic entry-level advancement of US Gov applicants to GS-7* 4 and member-only lifetime discounts from companies like Geico, Dell, SIRVA Home, PPI for FE/EIT and PE exams, and hotels around the world.

== Activities ==
Tau Beta Pi has an active fellowship and scholarship program supported by alumni members and other supporters. Some of the results of these programs are:

- 3,629 students have received scholarships for their senior year of engineering study since 1998.
- 1,736 students have been given Fellowship stipends exceeding $8,000,000 since 1929.
- 1,784 students have borrowed more than $862,000 from the educational loan program since 1932.

=== MindSET program ===
One initiative provided by Tau Beta Pi is the MindSET (Math, Science, Engineering, Technology) K-12 program. This program is designed to foster interest in engineering among elementary, middle, and high school students with classroom and hands-on activities. The goal of MindSET is to have students completing algebra by 8th grade and calculus by 12th grade. MindSET was first conceived by Dr. Jonathan F. Earle as GatorTRAX, a program run by the Florida Alpha chapter, and is now a national program with more than 50 active projects across the country.

== Notable members ==
Tau Beta Pi's membership includes some famous figures in engineering and technology, including 22 Nobel laureates.

== See also ==
- Honor society
- List of Tau Beta Pi alumni chapters
- Professional fraternities and sororities
