= Synchronization network =

Network of coupled dynamical systems

A synchronization network is a network of coupled dynamical systems. It consists of a network connecting oscillators, where oscillators are nodes that emit a signal with somewhat regular (possibly variable) frequency, and are also capable of receiving a signal.

Particularly interesting is the phase transition where the entire network (or a very large percentage) of oscillators begins pulsing at the same frequency, known as synchronization. The synchronization network then becomes the substrate through which synchronization of these oscillators travels. Since there is no central authority organizing nodes, this is a form of self-organizing system.

== Definition ==
Generally, oscillators can be biological, electronic, or physical. Some examples are fireflies, crickets, heart cells, lasers, microwave oscillators, and neurons. Further example can be found in many domains.

In a particular system, oscillators may be identical or non-identical. That is, either the network is made up of homogeneous or heterogeneous nodes.

Properties of oscillators include: frequency, phase and natural frequency.

Network edges describe couplings between oscillators. Couplings may be physical attachment, or consist of some proximity measure through a medium such as air or space.

Networks have several properties, including: number of nodes (oscillators), network topology, and coupling strength between oscillators.

The local stability of complete synchronization in networks of identical dynamical systems can be analyzed using the master stability function, which relates the stability of the synchronous state to the eigenvalues of the network's coupling matrix.

== Kuramoto model ==
Kuramoto developed a major analytical framework for coupled dynamical systems, as follows:

A network of oscillators with varied natural frequencies will be incoherent while the coupling strength is weak.

Letting $\theta_i(t)$ be the phase of the $i$th oscillator and $\omega_i$ be its natural frequency, randomly selected from a Cauchy-Lorentz distribution as follows,

$g(\omega) = \frac{\gamma}{\pi[\gamma^2 + (\omega - \omega_0)^2)}$, having width $\gamma$ and central value $\omega_0$,

we obtain a description of collective synchronization:

$\frac{d\theta_i}{dt} = \omega_i + \frac{1}{N} \sum^N_{j = 1} K_{ij} \sin(\theta_j - \theta_i), i = 1, ..., N$,

where $N$ is the number of nodes (oscillators), and $K_{ij}$ is the coupling strength between nodes $i$ and $j$.

Kuramoto has also developed an "order parameter", which measures synchronization between nodes:

$r(t) = \bigg| \frac{1}{N} \sum^N_{j = 1} e^{i\theta_j(t)}\bigg|$

This leads to the asymptotic definition of $K_c$, the critical coupling strength, as $N \to \infty$ and $t \to \infty$

$$r =
\begin{cases}
0, & K < K_c \\
\sqrt{1-(K_c/K)}, & K \ge K_c
\end{cases}$$

with $K_c = 2 \gamma$.

Note that $r = 0 \Rightarrow$ no synchronization, and $r = |e^{i\theta}|=1\Rightarrow$ perfect synchronization.

Beyond $K_c$, each oscillator will belong to one of two groups:

- a group that is synchronized.
- a group that will never synchronize, since their natural frequencies vary too greatly from the synchronization frequency.

== Network topology ==
Synchronization networks may have many topologies. Topology may have a great deal of influence over the spread of dynamics.

Some major topologies are listed below:

- Regular networks: This describes networks where every node has the same number of links. Lattices, rings, and fully connected networks are some examples of this topology.
- Random graphs: Developed by Erdős and Rényi, these graphs are characterized by a constant probability of a link existing between any two nodes.
- Small-world networks: These networks are the result of rewiring a certain number of edges in regular lattice networks. The resulting networks have much smaller average path length than the original networks.
- Scale-free networks: Found ubiquitously in naturally occurring systems, scale free networks are characterized by a large number of high-degree nodes. In particular, the degree distribution follows a power law.

== History ==
Coupled oscillators have been studied for many years, at least since the Wilberforce pendulum in 1896. In particular, pulse coupled oscillators were pioneered by Peskin in 1975 with his study of cardiac cells. Winfree developed a mean-field approach to synchronization in 1967, which was developed further in the Kuramoto model in the 1970s and 1980s to describe large systems of coupled oscillators. Crawford brought the tools of manifold theory and bifurcation theory to bear on the stability of synchronization with his work in the mid-1990s. These works coincided with the development of a more general theory of coupled dynamical systems and popularization by Strogatz et al. in 1990, continuing through the early 2000s.

== See also ==
- Complex network
- Statistical mechanics
- Spontaneous order
