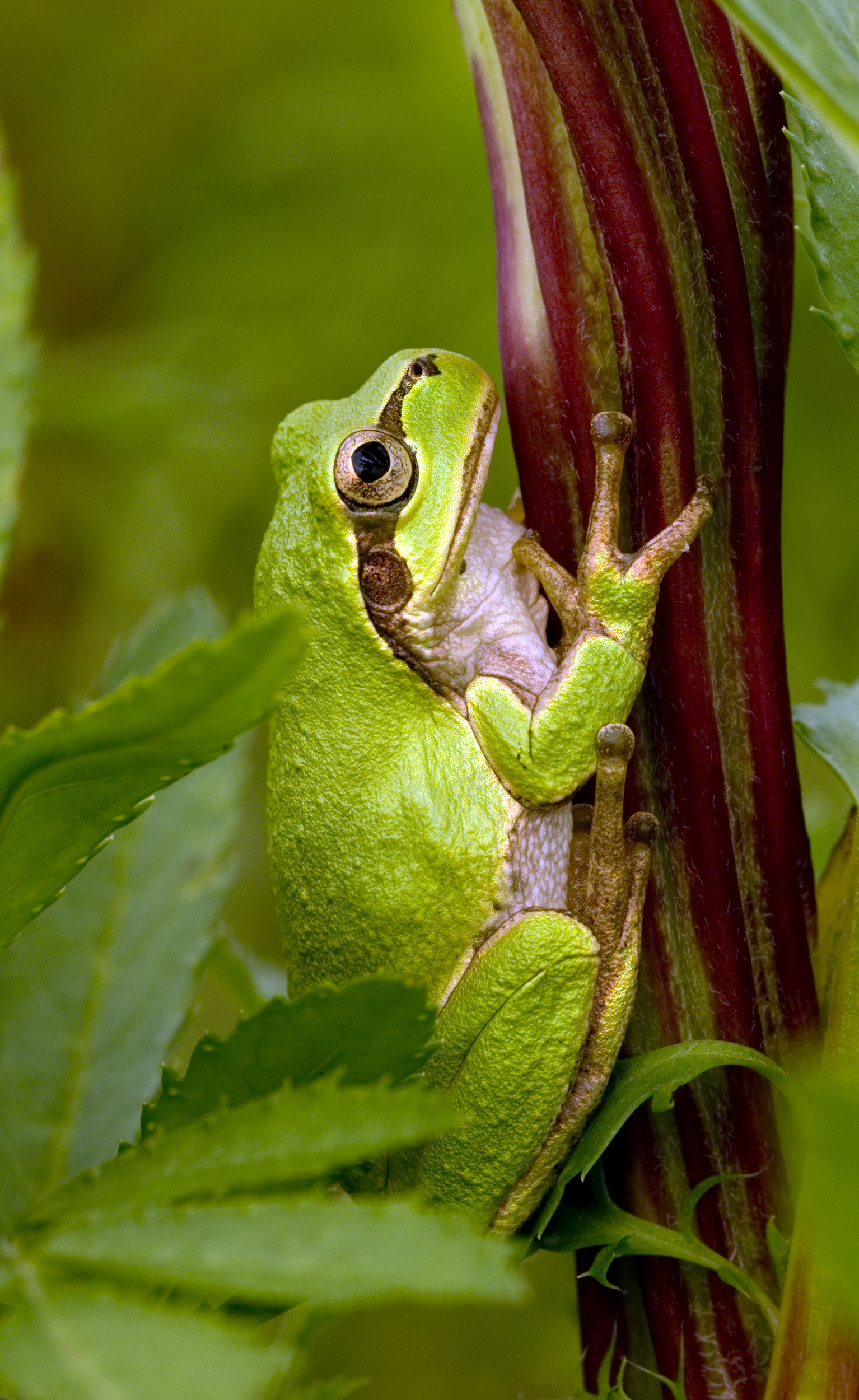
- Japanese tree frog resting on a plant.

Conservation status
- Least Concern (IUCN 3.1)

Scientific classification
- Kingdom: Animalia
- Phylum: Chordata
- Class: Amphibia
- Order: Anura
- Family: Hylidae
- Genus: Dryophytes
- Species: D. japonicus

Binomial name
- Dryophytes japonicus (Günther, 1859)

Synonyms
- Hyla arborea japonica Günther, 1859; Hyla japonica Günther, 1859; Hyla heinzsteinitzi Grach, Plessed and Werner, 2007

= Japanese tree frog =

Amphibian species from East Asia

Dryophytes japonicus, with frequently used synonym Hyla japonica, commonly known as the Japanese tree frog, is a species of anuran native to Japan, China, and Korea. It is unique in its ability to withstand extreme cold, with some individuals showing cold resistance at temperatures as low as −30 °C for up to 120 days. Japanese tree frogs are not currently facing any notable risk of extinction and are classified by the IUCN as a species of "least concern". Notably, it has been sent to space in a study that explored the effect of microgravity on Japanese tree frogs. Some consider that Dryophytes japonicus is synonymous with Hyla japonica. However, a 2025 study treated that this species as Dryophytes japonicus again, and separated northern species as Dryophytes leopardus.

The Japanese tree frog lives in a variety of habitats such as wetlands, forests, rivers, and mountains. They are generally located near vegetation near water sources and forests. They are carnivores that prey on insects and spiders. Their average clutch size is around 340–1,500 eggs, and their lifespan is usually around six years. There is an estimated 100 million of these frogs in Japan, but the accuracy is limited due to difficulty in counting.

== Taxonomy ==
Some authorities use the scientific name, Hyla japonica, in reference to the Japanese tree frog. The binomial name, Dryophytes japonicus, is also sometimes used. Studies have characterized the relationship between H. suweonensis and H. japonica. H. suweonensis is a closely related species to H. japonica. In general, H. suweonensis is smaller and more slender than H. japonica. The distance between nostril and upper lip (NL), distance between posterior corners of eyes (EPD), distance between semi-minor axis of the upper eye (LILe), angle between the two lines that connect the posterior corner of the eyes and ipsilateral nostrils (αEPD-N), and the angle between the two lines that connect the anterior corner of the eyes and the ipsilateral nostrils (αEAD-N) can all be used to differentiate between H. suweonensis and H. japonica. In 2025, populations in Japan east of Kansai and Sakhalin were reclassified as Dryophytes leopardus.

== Description ==
Japanese tree frogs are on average 32.81±0.96 mm in length. They have an average skull width of 12.02±0.36 mm and an average skull length of 9.38±0.14 mm. The dorsal body of Japanese tree frog is green/brown and the ventral body is white. It is also characterized by a dark spot on the upper lip below the eye. Female Japanese tree frogs, on average, are larger in size compared to male. It has a dark vocal sac.

=== Abnormal coloration ===
Some Japanese tree frogs are abnormally colored. Frogs observed in South Korea were found to be entirely blue, while others yellow, with green dorsal patterns. Another frog found in Russia was observed to be fully blue, and was captured for observation, where it ultimately returned to a green/brown color. Specific reasons behind such observations in color are currently unexplained, but mutations and maladaptations have been put forth by scientists as possible explanations. Further work must be conducted in order to elucidate the mechanisms behind these color changes.

== Habitat and distribution ==
Japanese tree frogs are found in many parts of Asia, specifically in Japan, China, Korea, Mongolia, and Russia. It inhabits forest-like environments, bushlands, meadows, swamps, and river valleys. Japanese tree frog, like most frog species, inhabit locations with both aquatic and terrestrial features. This is due to the necessity of the frog life cycle for both water and land.

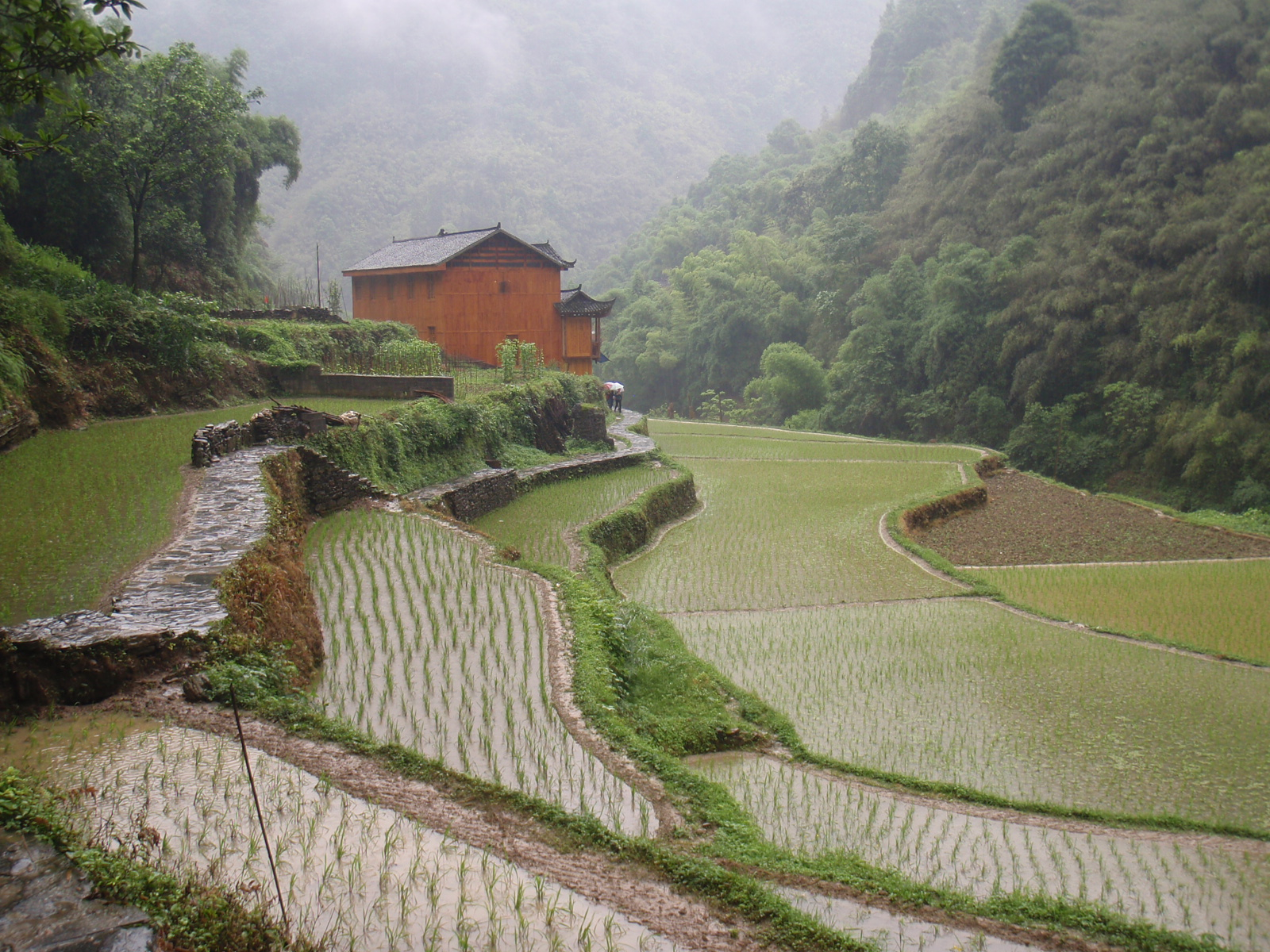
Habitat of Japanese tree frogs

A Japanese tree frog in Chiba, Japan

Changes in availability of native Japanese tree frog habitats have resulted in rice paddies serving as lodging for it. It seems to be able to inhabit these rice paddies successfully and have a demonstrated preference for sites high in vegetation.

== Behavior ==
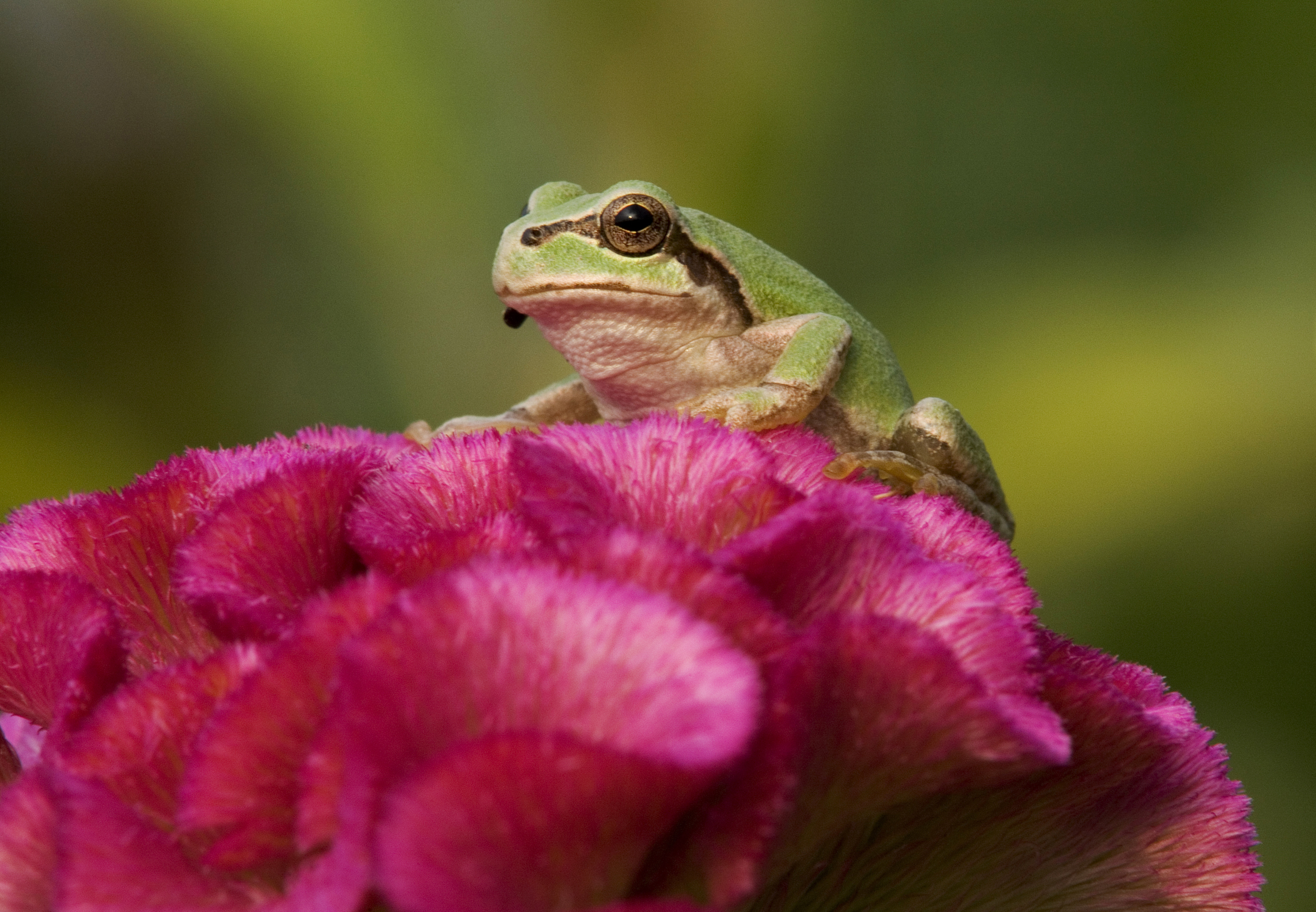
During courtship rituals, male Japanese Tree frogs attract the attention of females by croaking rhythmically. Neighboring males tend to alternate the croaking (croak $\pi$ degree out of phase) so as to avoid "speaking over each other". Evidence suggests this (anti)-synchronization influences the inter-frog spatial dynamics, making them swarmalators.

The behavior of Japanese tree frog when exposed to microgravity has been experimentally investigated. These frogs, under such microgravity conditions, would bend their neck backwards. These frogs would also walk backwards, an observation consistent with the behavior of sick frogs. The combination of neck backwards movement and backward walking could be indicators of motion sickness in the frogs. They were shown to adapt to the microgravity and were able to improve their jumping and perching activity over time. Japanese tree frogs, under micro-gravitational conditions, were also observed to attempt to eat but were unable to ingest the food. All the frogs that were sent to space were safely recovered and were observed to resume normal function after 2.5 hours back under normal gravity.

== Diet ==
Japanese tree frog forages in both breeding and non-breeding seasons. They are known to be opportunistic predators. This feature of this species was discovered through analysis that showed a strong correlation between the relative abundance of organisms in a given environment and the prey composition for that environment. Its diet consists of ants, beetles, caterpillars, flies, and spiders. There does not appear to be a significant difference in the diet composition between the two sexes of this species. However, during the breeding season, males have a higher chance of having an empty stomach due to the heightened energetic cost imposed by breeding.

== Mating ==
=== Mating system ===
Male Japanese tree frogs are observed to congregate in leks in an attempt to mate with female. A lek is an area where males will congregate in order to perform courtship displays in order to mate with females. Male leks seem to form preferentially at spots with significant water resources. Female distribution appears to be skewed towards male lekking sites. These lekking sites were identified by their extremely high male density. Female distribution does not seem to be explained by other factors like water availability, vegetation, or herbicide levels. The lek model that seems to fit the lekking exhibited by this species is the environmental hotspot model. This is because the sites that had the highest male density were those that had significantly high female encounter rates. Thus, there seems to be some bias of lek location towards areas with high female densities. Females need water for oviposition and the preference of male leks to form near water could be a mediating factor in choosing spots close to females.

=== Calling ===
Males will call to signal their presence to females and to compete with other males. Notes of this species calls are made up of fine pulses, and exist mainly at the frequency of 1.7 kHz. Japanese tree frog was observed to make the majority, if not all, of their calls at night. It also seemed to call when they were located on the banks of rice paddies. Note length and note interval were observed to decrease in males when temperature increased.

=== Preference ===
Japanese tree frogs are observed to prefer more shallow and smaller bodies of water for breeding. They prefer bodies of water termed oxbow lakes, likely due to their freestanding nature and higher chance of being refilled. Oxbow lakes are likely preferred due to the inability of tadpoles to swim along or against strong currents.

=== Infection effects on calling ===
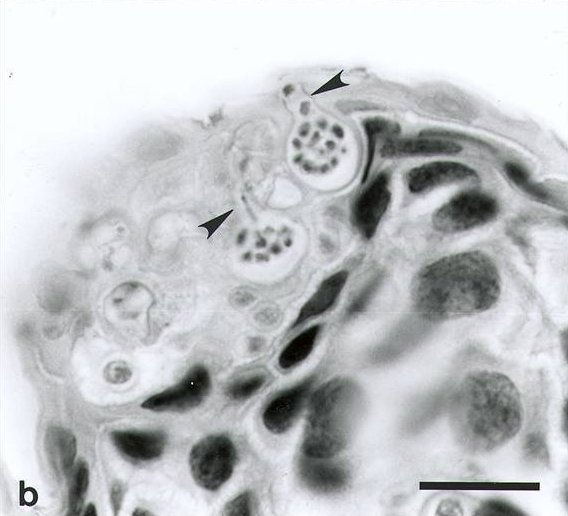
Chytridiomycosis

Japanese tree frog is susceptible to infection by Batrachochytrium dendrobatidis. Batrachochytrium dendrobatidis infection causes a disease termed Chytridiomycosis. Chytridiomycosis is an amphibian disease that has devastated many amphibian populations across the world. It seems to be susceptible to Chytridiomycosis, however the disease does not appear to pose a high burden to this species. In fact, it has not been observed to suffer from increased morbidity or mortality from Chytridiomycosis This species in Korea seem to have Batrachochytrium dendrobatidis infection rates ranging from 10.6 to16.2%.

Chytridiomycosis has been observed to affect the calling of Japanese tree frogs in a multitude of different ways. Number of pulses per note and note duration were both observed to be significantly higher in infected ones compared to uninfected ones.

The increased effort devoted to reproductive efforts by infected specimens is an interesting result that warrants further research. Two hypotheses have been proposed to explain the observed behavior. First, this increased investment towards reproduction might be a result of Batrachochytrium dendrobatidis driving increased reproduction in order to increase spread of infection. Another hypothesis is that it increases its reproductive effort in the event that they die earlier due to Chytridiomycosis. This behavior would increase the chance of reproductive success by propagating their genes before they die.

=== Heterospecific amplexus ===
This species have been observed with Pelophylax chosenicus in amplexus. Both species inhabit rice paddies and this shared habitat is a possible explanation for the observed interspecies copulation. Mating between different, but closely related species can sometimes result in hybridization. Further work is required to uncover the extent of heterospecific amplexus between this species and Pelophylax chosenicus.

== Predators ==
=== Predation by the American bullfrog ===
Lithobates catesbeianus, colloquially known as the American bullfrog, is an exotic predator of Japanese tree frogs. Predation by L. catesbeianus has been shown to significantly decrease the bone mineral density of these tree frogs. Because bone mineral density can be used as a proxy for food intake, the conclusion that L. catesbeianus predation of this species exerted a predation pressure that reduced food intake of it can be drawn. Predation by L. catesbeianus was not observed to induce any morphological changes in Japanese tree frogs.

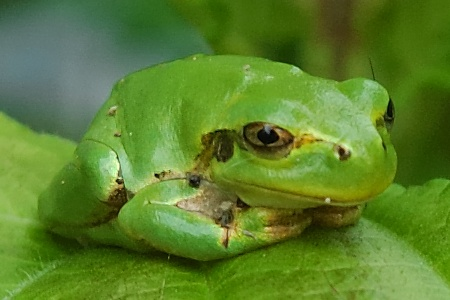
A Japanese tree frog on a leaf.

== Physiology ==
=== Predator defense by toxic peptide secretion ===
Japanese tree frogs have evolved against predation in arboreal environments by producing special Anntoxin-like neurotoxins from their skin. Anntoxin is a 60-residue toxic peptide that inhibits ion channels such as tetrodotoxin-sensitive voltage-gated sodium channels. While these peptides display analgesic properties after binding onto ion channels, they can harm and kill predators after frog skin consumption. Such a mechanism deters predators from further frog hunting.

=== Cold resistance ===
Japanese tree frogs demonstrates the remarkable ability to withstand extremely cold temperatures. It is able to survive temperatures as low as −35 °C. The majority of individuals in a population from the Amur River were shown to withstand multiple rounds of exposure to −30 °C. These specimens were shown to survive at −30 °C for up to 120 days. Other frog species, at such temperatures, will accumulate ice, a phenomenon that proves lethal. This accumulation of ice was not observed in this species.

During the exposure to cold, Japanese tree frogs seems to produce glycerol. This production of glycerol increases as temperature decreases. It is thought that this glycerol production plays a role in the cold-resistance of this species. However, other frog species have similar glycerol production, but do not have cold resistance to the extent of this frog. Thus, the biochemical mechanism for the cold resistance of Japanese tree frogs is yet to be fully determined.

=== Bone mineral density ===
Japanese tree frogs have also been studied in order to determine the predictive ability of bone mineral density on the physiological well-being of frogs. Frogs with observed bone fractures on CT scan did not have significantly different bone mineral densities in comparison to healthy frogs. Thus, these frogs were unlikely to suffer from bone mineral diseases, and their fractures are more likely attributed to trauma-related injury.

Bone mineral density was strongly correlated to snout-vent length in this species. Bone mineral density was not observed to be significantly different between males and females. This lack of difference can be attributed to the similar eating habits of both male and female. They were observed to have fractures distributed similarly in both their forelimbs and hindlimbs.

Bone mineral density was able to effectively evaluate food status and physiological condition in this species. This finding offers a mechanism for determination of food status for anuran populations.

=== Anuran vasotocin and mesotocin receptors ===
Japanese tree frog has been used to determine the effects of anuran vasotocin (VT) and mesotocin (MT) receptors. VT, coupled to cyclic AMP, has antidiuretic effects in most amphibians. MT, which acts through the inositol/calcium signaling pathway induces diuretic effects in most amphibians. It was discovered that this species contains both VT and MT receptors and that these receptors are differentially expressed in the body of the frog. VT receptors are localized to the pelvic patch of skin, whereas MT receptors are found in the fat body of the frog. Both MT and CT receptors are found in the brain, heart, kidney, and urinary bladder. This differential distribution of MT and VT receptors affects the cutaneous water absorption of the frog.

== Conservation ==
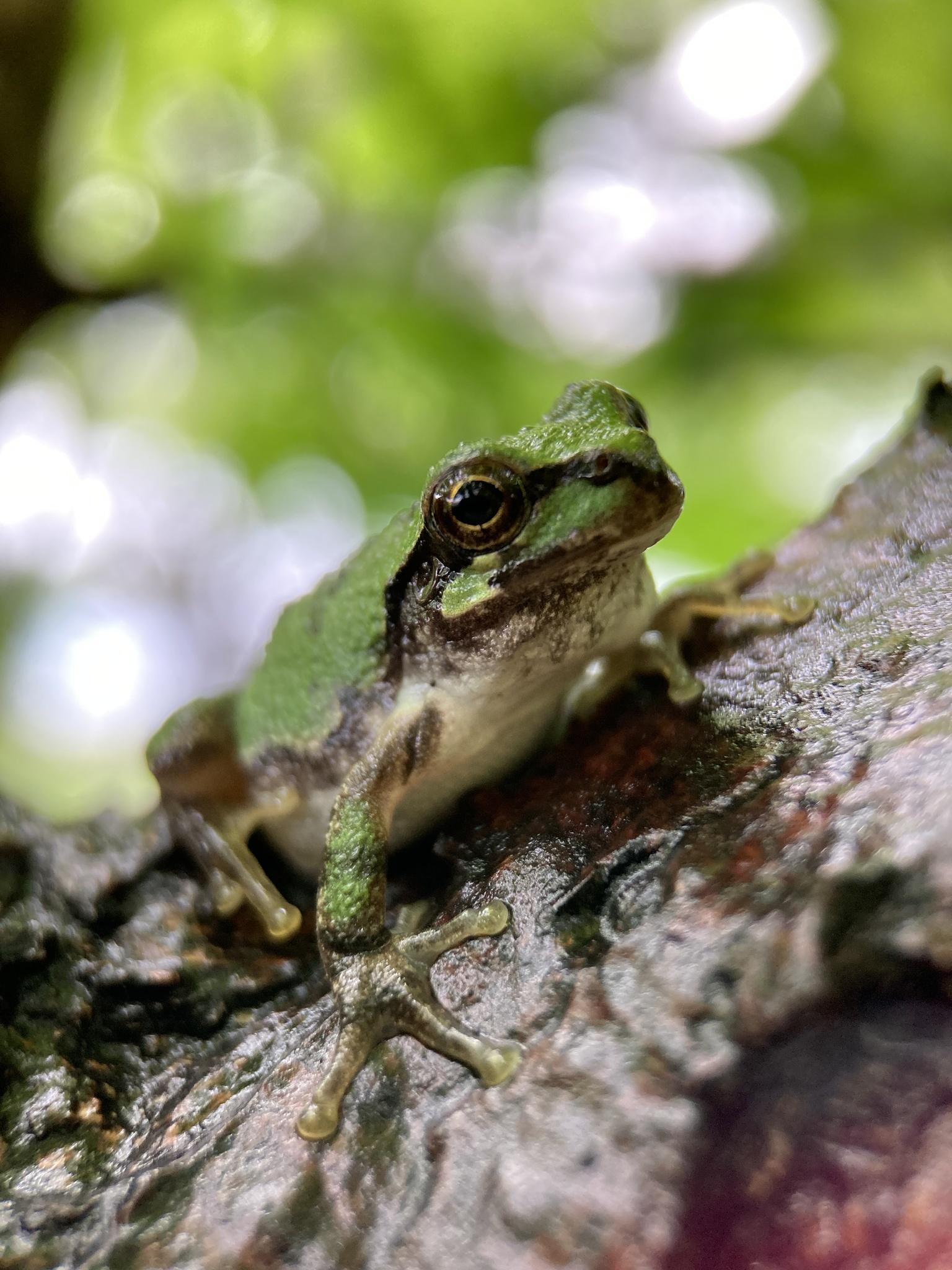
Hyla japonica standing on the ground.

The IUCN determined that the endangerment level of Japanese tree frogs is of "Least Concern". The population is listed as stable and non-fragmented. The IUCN lists some potential threats to Japanese tree frogs, which are primarily pollution and related to other environmental factors. Specifically, droughts that will occur at a higher frequency due to climate change will negatively affect the habitats of them as they rely on inland water to survive. In addition, increased agriculture and land for livestock may displace some populations. They are reported to be able to survive in other habitats, such as rice paddies. Thus, the effects of this shift in potential habitat are unlikely to affect this species due to the ability of the frog to survive in habitats ranging from urban to mountainous regions.

Additionally, its tadpoles are susceptible to the ranavirus. Ranavirus transmits through animal-animal contact and has symptoms including abdominal edema, skin hemorrhaging, as well as damage to the liver, kidney, and spleen. Climate and habitat change have both contributed to increased virus transmission. Aside from tadpoles, ranavirus infects many amphibians, fish, and other cold-blood species.

== Human application ==
Males of Japanese tree frogs will space their calls out such that males will avoid calling at the same time. This spacing out occurs in order to allow females to listen to each of the males' calls. In situations where multiple males call at the same time, the female is unable to determine the location of each male calling. This makes mating difficult because the female has to be able to locate the male in order to mate. Males are able to desynchronize their calls with relatively little central organization or communication.

Humans have studied this ability of its males to behave in a coordinated manner despite no central organization or communication. Humans have used observations of this species in order to design wireless communication networks in order to improve efficiency in situations where no central communication hub is present. This area of science and development is termed "swarm intelligence" and further research is currently being conducted.
