= Master stability function =

In mathematics, the master stability function is a tool used to analyze the stability of the synchronous state in a dynamical system consisting of many identical systems which are coupled together, such as the Kuramoto model.

The setting is as follows. Consider a system with $N$ identical oscillators. Without the coupling, they evolve according to the same differential equation, say $\dot{x}_i = f(x_i)$ where $x_i$ denotes the state of oscillator $i$. A synchronous state of the system of oscillators is where all the oscillators are in the same state.

The coupling is defined by a coupling strength $\sigma$, a matrix $A_{ij}$ which describes how the oscillators are coupled together, and a function $g$ of the state of a single oscillator. Including the coupling leads to the following equation:

$$\dot{x}_i = f(x_i) + \sigma \sum_{j=1}^N A_{ij} g(x_j).$$

It is assumed that the row sums $\sum_j A_{ij}$ vanish so that the manifold of synchronous states is neutrally stable.

The master stability function is now defined as the function which maps the complex number $\gamma$ to the greatest Lyapunov exponent of the equation

$$\dot{y} = (Df + \gamma Dg) y.$$

The synchronous state of the system of coupled oscillators is stable if the master stability function is negative at $\sigma \lambda_k$ where $\lambda_k$ ranges over the eigenvalues of the coupling matrix $A$.

== See also ==
- Synchronization of chaos
- Synchronization network
- Laplacian matrix
- Algebraic connectivity
