= Oscillatory neural network =

Type of artificial neural network

An oscillatory neural network (ONN) is an artificial neural network that uses coupled oscillators as neurons. Oscillatory neural networks are closely linked to the Kuramoto model, and are inspired by the phenomenon of neural oscillations in the brain. Oscillatory neural networks have been trained to recognize images. Complex-Valued Oscillatory network has also been shown to store and retrieve multidimensional aperiodic signals. An oscillatory autoencoder has also been demonstrated, which uses a combination of oscillators and rate-coded neurons.

A neuron made of two coupled oscillators, one having a fixed and the other having a tunable natural frequency, has been shown able to run logic gates such as XOR that conventional sigmoid neurons cannot.
