= Percolation (cognitive psychology) =

Theoretical model

Percolation (from the Latin word percolatio, meaning filtration) is a theoretical model used to understand the way activation and diffusion of neural activity occurs within neural networks. Percolation is a model used to explain how neural activity is transmitted across the various connections within the brain. Percolation theory can be easily understood by explaining its use in epidemiology. Individuals who are infected with a disease can spread the disease through contact with others in their social network. Those who are more social and come into contact with more people will help to propagate the disease quicker than those who are less social. Factors such as occupation and sociability influence the rate of infection. Now, if one were to think of neurons as individuals and synaptic connections as the social bonds between people, then one can determine how easily messages between neurons will spread. When a neuron fires, the message is transmitted along all synaptic connections to other neurons until it can no longer continue. Synaptic connections are considered either open or closed (like a social or unsocial person) and messages will flow along any and all open connections until they can go no further. Just as occupation and sociability play a key role in the spread of disease, so too do the number of neurons, synaptic plasticity and long-term potentiation when talking about neural percolation.

== Percolating cluster ==
A key aspect of percolation is the concept of percolating clusters, which are single large groups of neurons that are all connected by open bonds and take up the majority of the network. Any signals that originate at any point within the percolating cluster will have a greater impact and diffusion across the network than signals that originate outside of the cluster. This is similar to a teacher spreading an infection to a whole community through contact with the students and subsequently with the families than an isolated businessman that works from home.

== History and background ==
Percolation theory was originally purposed by Broadbent and Hammersley as a mathematical theory for determining the flow of fluids through porous material. An example of this is the question originally purposed by Broadbent and Hammersley: "suppose a large porous rock is submerged under water for a long time, will the water reach the center of the stone?". Since its founding, percolation theory has been used in both applied fields and mathematical modeling, areas such as engineering, physics, chemistry, communications, economics, mathematics, medicine and geography. From a mathematical perspective, percolation is uniquely able to exhibit both algebraic and probabilistic relationships graphically. In network and cognitive sciences, percolation theory is often used as a computational model that has the benefit of testing theories on neural activity before any physical testing is necessary. It can also be used as a model to explain experimental observations of neural activity to a certain extent.

== Current research ==
Percolation has been developed outside of the cognitive sciences; however, its application in the field has proven it to be a useful tool for understanding neural processes. Researchers have focused their attention not only studying how neural activity is diffused across networks, but also how percolation and its aspect of phase transition can affect decision making and thought processes. Percolation theory has enabled researchers to better understand many psychological conditions, such as epilepsy, disorganized schizophrenia and divergent thinking. These conditions are often indicative of percolating clusters and their involvement in propagating the excess firing of neurons. Seizures occur when neurons in the brain fire simultaneously, and often these seizures can occur in one part of the brain which may then transfer to other parts. Researchers are able to facilitate a better understanding of these conditions because "the neurons involved in a seizure are analogous to the sites in a percolating cluster". Disorganized schizophrenia is more complex as the activity is indicative activity in a percolating cluster; however, some researchers have suggested that the percolation of information does not occur in a small cluster but on a global functional scale. Attention as well as percolation also plays a key role in disorganized and divergent thinking; however, it is more likely that directed percolation, that is a directionally controlled percolation, is more useful to study divergent thinking and creativity.

=== Table of recent research ===
Below is a table of some of the studies and experiments that have involved percolation. The majority of these studies focus on the application of percolation theory to neural network processing from a computational approach.

Researcher(s)	Article	Overview
J.P. Eckmann, E. Moses, O. Stetter, T. Tlusty, & C. Zbinden	Leaders of neuronal cultures in a quorum percolation model	Researchers use quorum percolation to describe the impacts of neural activity initiation in neural networks
S. Leleu-Merviel	On the relevance of percolation theory to the acquisition of human skills	This paper discusses the contributions that percolation theory has made to the acquisition of human skills
R. Kozma, M. Puljic & L. Perlovsky	Modeling goal-oriented decision making through cognitive phase transitions	Researchers use neuropercolation models to outline the implications to decision making
R. Kozma, M. Puljic, P. Balister, B. Bollobas & W. J. Freeman	Phase transitions in the neuropercolation model of neural populations with mixed local and non-local interactions	Researchers aim to model phase transitions within the brain using percolation to understand neurphil properties
L. K. Gallos, H. A. Makes & M. Sigman	A small world of weak ties provides optimal global integration of self-similar modules in functional brain networks	Researchers use a modified percolation theory to attempt show a new way of thinking about the modularity of the brain as opposed to the widely accepted view of small world networks
D. B. Van, P. Gong, M. Breakspear & C. Van Leeuwen	Fragmentation: Loss of global coherence or breakdown of modularity in functional brain architecture?	Researchers purpose that disorganized schizophrenia is not due to small-world organization but in fact a breakdown in local organization that leads to global modularity of functioning

== Other applications ==
Percolation theory has been applied to a wide variety of fields of study, including medicine, economics, physics, as well as other areas of psychology, such as social sciences and industrial and organizational psychology. Below is a table of other areas of study that apply percolation theory as well as recent research information.

Area of study	Researchers	Article
Medicine/Epidemiology	S. B. Khandelwal	Ecology of infectious diseases with contact networks and percolation theory
Economics	D. Duffie, G. Manso & S. Malamud	Information Percolation in Segmented Markets
Industrial/Organizational Psych	T. Grebel	Network evolution in basic science
Social Psych	R. Flores, M. Koster, I. Lindner, & E. Molina	Networks and collective action
Physics	N. Poccia, A. Ansuini & A. Bianconi	Far from Equilibrium Percolation, Stochastic and Shape Resonances in the Physics of Life
Geography	H. E. Winzeler, P. R. Owens, S. W. Waltman, W. J. Waltman, Z. Libohova & D. Beaudette	A Methodology for Examining Changes in Soil Climate Geography through Time: U.S. Soil Moisture Regimes for the Period 1971–2000
Artificial intelligence	I. Rebollo, M. Grana, & B. Cases	Effect of spatial percolation on the convergence of a graph colouring boid swarm
Emergency management and crisis prevention	J.L. Wybo	Percolation, temporal coherence of information, and crisis prevention

== Future research ==
Percolation theory is widely used and impacts many different fields; however, the research in network science can still be developed further. As a computational model, percolation has its limitations in that it cannot always account for the variability of real-life neural networks. Its limitations do not hinder its functionality in total, just in some cases. In order for one to understand small-world networks better, a closer objective look at percolation in neural networks is needed. The best possible way for this to occur would be to combine the applications of percolation modelling and experimental stimulation of artificial neural networks.
