= Iodine clock reaction =

Experiment to show chemical kinetics in action

Iodine clock reaction (persulfate variation)

The iodine clock reaction, sometimes called the Landolt reaction, is a classical chemical clock experiment that is performed as a mechanism to demonstrate chemical kinetics in action. It was first observed by Hans Heinrich Landolt in 1886. The iodine clock reaction exists in several variations, which each involve iodine species (iodide ion, free iodine, or iodate ion) and redox reagents in the presence of starch. Two colourless solutions are mixed and at first there is no visible reaction. After a short time delay, the liquid suddenly turns to a shade of dark blue due to the formation of a triiodide–starch complex. In some variations, the solution will repeatedly cycle from colorless to blue and back to colorless, until the reagents are depleted.

== Hydrogen peroxide variation ==
This method commences with a solution of hydrogen peroxide and sulfuric acid. To this, a solution containing potassium iodide, sodium thiosulfate, and starch is added. There are two reactions occurring simultaneously in the solution.

In the first, slow reaction, iodine is produced:

H_{2}O_{2} + 2 I^{−} + 2 H^{+} → I_{2} + 2 H_{2}O

In the second, fast reaction, iodine is reconverted to two iodide ions by the thiosulfate:

2 S_{2}O_{3}^{2–} + I_{2} → S_{4}O_{6}^{2–} + 2 I^{−}

After some time the solution changes color to a very dark blue, almost black.

H_{2}O_{2} and I^{−} are both first order. H^{+} is more complicated.

When the solutions are mixed, the second reaction causes the iodine to be consumed much faster than it is generated, and only a small amount of iodine is present in the dynamic equilibrium. Once the thiosulfate ion has been exhausted, this reaction stops and the blue colour caused by the iodine – starch complex appears.

Anything that accelerates the first reaction will shorten the time until the solution changes color. Decreasing the pH (increasing H^{+} concentration), or increasing the concentration of iodide or hydrogen peroxide will shorten the time. Adding more thiosulfate will have the opposite effect; it will take longer for the blue colour to appear.

Aside from using sodium thiosulfate as a substrate, cysteine can also be used.

Iodide from potassium iodide is converted to iodine in the first reaction:

2 I^{−} + 2 H^{+} + H_{2}O_{2} → I_{2} + 2 H_{2}O

The iodine produced in the first reaction is reduced back to iodide by the reducing agent, cysteine. At the same time, cysteine is oxidized into cystine.

2 C_{3}H_{7}NO_{2}S + I_{2} → C_{6}H_{12}N_{2}O_{4}S_{2} + 2 I^{−} + 2 H^{+}

Similar to the thiosulfate case, the blue color appears when the cysteine is exhausted.

== Iodate variation ==
An alternative protocol uses a solution of iodate ion (such as potassium iodate), to which an acidified solution (again with sulfuric acid) of sodium bisulfite is added.

In this protocol, iodide ion is generated by the following slow reaction between the iodate and bisulfite:

IO^{−}_{3} + 3 HSO^{−}_{3} → I^{−} + 3 HSO^{−}_{4}

This first step is the rate determining step. Next, the iodate in excess will oxidize the iodide generated above to form iodine:

IO^{−}_{3} + 5 I^{−} + 6 H^{+} → 3 I_{2} + 3 H_{2}O

However, the iodine is reduced immediately back to iodide by the bisulfite:

I_{2} + HSO^{−}_{3} + H_{2}O → 2 I^{−} + HSO^{−}_{4} + 2 H^{+}

When the bisulfite is fully consumed, the iodine will survive (meaning that it is no longer reduced by the bisulfite) to form the dark blue complex with starch.

== Persulfate variation ==
This clock reaction uses sodium, potassium or ammonium persulfate to oxidize iodide ions to iodine. Sodium thiosulfate is used to reduce iodine back to iodide before the iodine can complex with the starch to form the characteristic blue-black color.

Iodine is generated:

2 I^{−} + S_{2}O^{2−}_{8} → I_{2} + 2 SO^{2−}_{4}

And is then removed:

I_{2} + 2 S_{2}O^{2−}_{3} → 2 I^{−} + S_{4}O^{2−}_{6}

Once all the thiosulfate is consumed the iodine may form a complex with the starch. Potassium persulfate is less soluble (cfr. Salters website), while ammonium persulfate has a higher solubility and is used instead in the reaction described in examples from Oxford University.

== Chlorate variation ==
An experimental iodine clock sequence has also been established for a system consisting of iodine potassium-iodide, sodium chlorate and perchloric acid that takes place through the following reactions.

Triiodide is present in equilibrium with iodide anion and molecular iodine:

I^{−}_{3} ⇌ I_{2} + I^{−}

Chlorate ion oxidizes iodide ion to hypoiodous acid and chlorous acid in the slow and rate-determining step:

ClO^{−}_{3} + I^{−} + 2 H^{+} → HOI + HClO_{2}

Chlorate consumption is accelerated by reaction of hypoiodous acid to iodous acid and more chlorous acid:

ClO^{−}_{3} + HOI + H^{+} → HIO_{2} + HClO_{2}

More autocatalysis when newly generated iodous acid also converts chlorate in the fastest reaction step:

ClO^{−}_{3} + HIO_{2} → IO^{−}_{3} + HClO_{2}

In this clock, the induction period is the time it takes for the autocatalytic process to start, after which the concentration of free iodine falls rapidly as observed by UV–visible spectroscopy.

== See also ==
- Belousov–Zhabotinsky reaction
- Briggs–Rauscher reaction
- Chemical oscillator
- Clock reaction
- Old Nassau reaction
