= Mercury beating heart =

Chemical reaction

The mercury beating heart is an electrochemical redox reaction between the elements mercury, iron and chromium. The reaction causes a blob of mercury in water to oscillate.

The observeable reaction demonstrates an effect of a non-homogeneous electrical double layer. It is often used as a classroom demonstration.

== The experiment ==
Mercury beating heart is similar to gallium beating heart (shown on video).

In the experiment a droplet of mercury is placed in a watch glass, immersed in an electrolyte such as sulfuric acid which contains an oxidizing agent such as hydrogen peroxide, potassium permanganate, or potassium dichromate. The tip of an iron nail is positioned almost touching the mercury. If the position of the nail tip is just right, the mercury blob begins to oscillate, changing shape.

== The explanation ==
In one variation the mechanism is thought to be as follows:

The dichromate oxidizes the mercury, forming a layer of mercury oxide. In the process the dichromate is reduced to the chromium(III) ion. The oxidized layer on the mercury reduces the surface tension of the blob and the blob flattens out coming in contact with the iron nail. Then the mercury oxide oxidizes the iron to the iron(II) ion, and in the process is reduced back to metallic mercury. Once there is no oxide coating left on the mercury blob, the surface tension increases and the blob rounds up and loses contact with the nail, ready to start the process over again.

The net reaction is that the dichromate oxidizes the iron. This favorable reaction drives the mercury oxidations/reductions and the oscillations in shape. When the dichromate is fully reduced, the reaction stops.

There may be other mechanisms involved, however. Lin et al. appear to report that the oscillations occur without the presence of the oxidizing agent, though the mercury does not appear to get an oxidizing layer on it and the oscillations are much weaker.

An electrical double layer forms between the surface of the mercury droplet and the electrolyte solution. At rest this layer is uniform. When the iron tip is introduced, a redox reaction starts in which iron is oxidized to the ferric ion and the oxidizing reagent is spent (e.g. when hydrogen peroxide together with hydronium ions is reduced to water). Because the oxidation only takes place in the vicinity of the tip, and the reduction process covers the whole droplet surface, the surface tension is no longer homogeneous; this results in the observed oscillations.

Although this reaction is mediated by changes in surface tension, it is very similar in mechanism to other chemical oscillators such as the Belousov–Zhabotinsky reaction, which has several intermediate redox reactions driven by the oxidation of malate by bromine.

== History ==
The mercury beating heart was first observed in the year 1800 by Alessandro Volta and William Henry. The chemical phenomenon in the form best known today was first described by German chemist Friedlieb Ferdinand Runge, the discoverer of caffeine.

== See also ==
- Simple classroom demonstrations: Chemical garden - Barking dog reaction - blue bottle reaction
- Chemical oscillator
