= Briggs–Rauscher reaction =

Oscillating chemical reaction

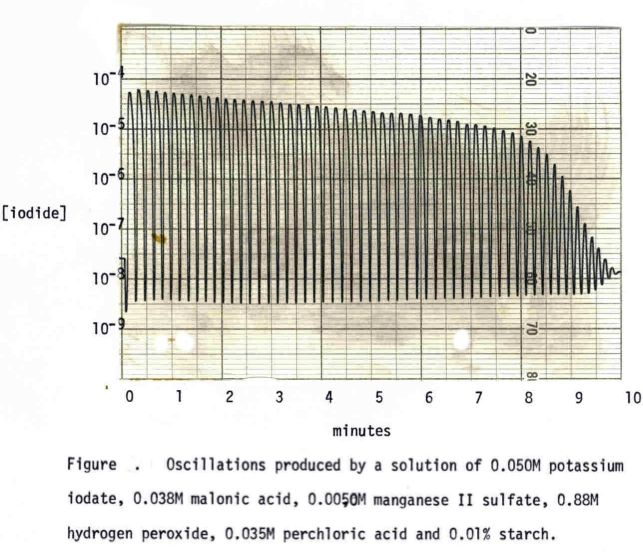
Oscillogram made in July 1972 by Briggs and Rauscher.

The Briggs–Rauscher oscillating reaction is one of a small number of known oscillating chemical reactions. It is especially well suited for demonstration purposes because of its visually striking colour changes: the freshly prepared colourless solution slowly turns an amber colour, then suddenly changes to a very dark blue. This slowly fades to colourless and the process repeats, about ten times in the most popular formulation, before ending as a dark blue liquid smelling strongly of iodine.

== History ==
The first known homogeneous oscillating chemical reaction, reported by W. C. Bray in 1921, was between hydrogen peroxide (H_{2}O_{2}) and iodate (IO^{−}_{3}) in acidic solution. Because of experimental difficulty, it attracted little attention and was unsuitable as a demonstration. In 1958 Boris Pavlovich Belousov discovered the Belousov–Zhabotinsky reaction (BZ reaction). The BZ reaction is suitable as a demonstration, but it too met with skepticism, largely because such oscillatory behaviour was unheard of up to that time, until Anatol Zhabotinsky learned of it and in 1964 published his research. In May 1972 a pair of articles in the Journal of Chemical Education brought it to the attention of Thomas Briggs and Warren Rauscher, two science instructors at Galileo High School in San Francisco. They discovered the Briggs–Rauscher oscillating reaction by replacing bromate (BrO^{−}_{3}) in the BZ reaction with iodate and adding hydrogen peroxide. They produced the strikingly colorful demonstration by adding starch indicator. Since then, many other investigators have added to the knowledge and uses of this very unusual reaction.

== Description ==
=== Initial conditions ===
The initial aqueous solution contains hydrogen peroxide, an iodate, divalent manganese (Mn^{2+}) as catalyst, a strong chemically unreactive acid (sulfuric acid (H_{2}SO_{4}) or perchloric acid (HClO_{4}) are good), and an organic compound with an active ("enolic") hydrogen atom attached to carbon which will slowly reduce free iodine (I_{2}) to iodide (I^{−}). (Malonic acid (CH_{2}(COOH)_{2}) is excellent for that purpose.) Starch is optionally added as an indicator to show the abrupt increase in iodide ion concentration as a sudden change from amber (free iodine) to dark blue (the "iodine-starch complex", which requires both iodine and iodide.)

Recently it has been shown, however, that the starch is not only an indicator for iodine in the reaction. In the presence of starch the number of oscillations is higher and the period times are longer compared to the starch-free mixtures. It was also found that the iodine consumption segment within one period of oscillation is also significantly longer in the starch-containing mixtures. This suggests that the starch probably acts as a reservoir for the iodine and iodide because of the starch-triiodide equilibrium, thereby modifying the kinetics of the steps in which iodine and iodide are involved.

The reaction is "poisoned" by chloride (Cl^{−}) ion, which must therefore be avoided, and will oscillate under a fairly wide range of initial concentrations. For recipes suitable for demonstration purposes, see Shakhashiri or preparations in the external links.

=== Terminal conditions ===
The residual mixture contains iodinated malonic acid, inorganic acid, manganous catalysts, unreacted iodate and hydrogen peroxide. After the oscillations cease, the iodomalonic acid decomposes and iodine is produced. The rate of decomposition depends on the conditions. All of the components present in the residual mixture are of environmental concern: Iodate, iodine and hydrogen peroxide are strong oxidants, the acid is corrosive and manganese has been suggested to cause neurological disorders. A simple method has been developed employing thiosulfate and carbonate – two inexpensive salts – to remove all oxidants, neutralize the acidity and recover the manganous ion in the form of manganese dioxide.

=== Behaviour in time ===
Video of Briggs–Rauscher reaction

The reaction shows recurring periodic changes, both gradual and sudden, which are visible: slow changes in the intensity of colour, interrupted by abrupt changes in hue. This demonstrates that a complex combination of slow and fast reactions are taking place simultaneously. For example, following the iodide ion concentration with a silver/silver iodide electrode (see § Videos) shows sudden dramatic swings of several orders of magnitude separated by slower variations. This is shown by the oscillogram above. Oscillations persist over a wide range of temperatures. Higher temperatures make everything happen faster, with some qualitative change observable (see § Effect of temperature). Stirring the solution throughout the reaction is helpful for sharp colour changes; otherwise spatial variations may develop (see § Videos). Bubbles of free oxygen are evolved throughout, and in most cases, the final state is rich in free iodine.

== Variants ==
=== Changing the initial concentrations ===
As noted above, the reaction will oscillate in a fairly wide range of initial concentrations of the reactants. For oscillometric demonstrations, more cycles are obtained in dilute solutions, which produce weaker colour changes. See for example the graph, which shows more than 40 cycles in 8 minutes.

=== Changing the organic substrate ===
Malonic acid has been replaced by other suitable organic molecules, such as acetone (CH_{3}COCH_{3}) or acetylacetone (CH_{3}COCH_{2}COCH_{3}, pentane-2,4-dione). More exotic substrates have been used. The resulting oscillographic records often show distinctive features, for example as reported by Szalai.

=== Continuous flow reactors ===
The reaction may be made to oscillate indefinitely by using a continuous flow stirred tank reactor (CSTR), in which the starting reagents are continuously introduced and excess fluid is drawn.

=== Two dimensional phase space plots ===
By omitting the starch and monitoring the concentration of I_{2} photometrically, (i.e., measuring the absorption of a suitable light beam through the solution) while simultaneously monitoring the concentration of iodide ion with an iodide-selective electrode, a distorted spiral XY-plot will result. In a continuous-flow reactor, this becomes a closed loop (limit cycle).

=== Fluorescent demonstration ===
By replacing the starch with a fluorescent dye, Weinberg and Muyskens (2007) produced a demonstration visible in darkness under UV illumination.

== Use as a biological assay ==
The reaction has been proposed as an assay procedure for antioxidants in foodstuffs. The sample to be tested is added at the onset of oscillations, stopping the action for a period proportional to its antioxidant activity. Compared to existing assay methods, this procedure is quick and easy and operates at the pH of the human stomach. For a detailed description suitable for high school chemistry, see Preparations. In contrast to the findings referring predominantly to polyphenolic compounds reported in the above cited literature, it was found that the salicylic acid – a simple monophenolic compound – did not stop the oscillations immediately after it was added into the active Briggs-Rauscher mixture. In the low concentration interval the salicyclic acid only damped the oscillations, while in higher concentrations the damping effect was much stronger and complete inhibition was also observed. Sulfosalicylic acid, a derivative of salicyclic acid, practically did not affect the oscillations.

== Chemical mechanism ==
The detailed mechanism of this reaction is quite complex. Nevertheless, a good general explanation can be given.

For best results, and to prevent side reactions that may interfere with the main reaction, the solutions are best prepared a short time before the reaction. If left undisturbed, or exposed to ultra-violet radiation the reactants can decompose or react with themselves, interfering with the process.

The essential features of the system depend on two key processes (These processes each involve many reactions working together):

- A ("non-radical process"): The slow consumption of free iodine by the malonic acid substrate in the presence of iodate. This process involves the intermediate production of iodide ion.
- B ("radical process"): A fast auto-catalytic process involving manganese and free radical intermediates, which converts hydrogen peroxide and iodate to free iodine and oxygen. This process also can consume iodide up to a limiting rate.

But process B can operate only at low concentrations of iodide, creating a feedback loop as follows:

Initially, iodide is low and process B generates free iodine, which gradually accumulates. Meanwhile, process A slowly generates the intermediate iodide ion out of the free iodine at an increasing rate proportional to its (i.e. I_{2}) concentration. At a certain point, this overwhelms process B, stopping the production of more free iodine, which is still being consumed by process A. Thus, eventually the concentration of free iodine (and thus iodide) falls low enough for process B to start up again and the cycle repeats as long as the original reactants hold out.

The overall result of both processes is (again, approximately):

IO^{−}_{3} + 2 H_{2}O_{2} + CH_{2}(COOH)_{2} + H^{+} → ICH(COOH)_{2} + 2 O_{2} + 3 H_{2}O

The colour changes seen during the reaction correspond to the actions of the two processes: the slowly increasing amber colour is due to the production of free iodine by process B. When process B stops, the resulting increase in iodide ion enables the sudden blue starch colour. But since process A is still acting, this slowly fades back to clear. The eventual resumption of process B is invisible, but can be revealed by the use of a suitable electrode.

A negative feedback loop which includes a delay (mediated here by process A) is a general mechanism for producing oscillations in many physical systems, but is very rare in nonbiological homogeneous chemical systems. (The BZ oscillating reaction has a somewhat similar feedback loop.)
