= Anne De Wit =

Belgian physical chemist

Anne De Wit is a Belgian physical chemist whose research focuses on pattern formation and spatio-temporal dynamics in nonlinear interactions between chemical reactions and hydrodynamics, including processes in which chemical reactions drive convective fluid flows, and the analysis of chemical gardens. She is a professor at the Université libre de Bruxelles, director of the university's Nonlinear Physical Chemistry Unit, and co-director of its "Service de Chimie Physique and Biologie Théorique" in the International Solvay Institutes for Physics and Chemistry.

== Education ==
De Wit studied chemistry at the Université libre de Bruxelles, receiving a licenciate in 1989 and a doctorate in 1993. After postdoctoral studies at Stanford University, she returned to the Université libre de Bruxelles and completed a habilitation in 2004.

== Recognition ==
De Wit was named as a Fellow of the American Physical Society (APS) in 2015, after a nomination from the APS Division of Fluid Dynamics, "for pioneering contributions to our understanding of the coupling between chemical reaction, hydrodynamics, and pattern formation driven by coupled reacting-hydrodynamic systems". She was elected to the Royal Academy of Science, Letters and Fine Arts of Belgium in 2022.
