= Iodate fluoride =

Class of chemical compounds

The iodate fluorides are chemical compounds which contain both iodate and fluoride anions (IO_{3}^{−} and F^{−}). In these compounds fluorine is not bound to iodine as it is in fluoroiodates.

Iodate fluorides are under investigation for the non-linear optical properties. The lack of symmetry is enhanced by the lone pair of electrons on the iodate group.

== List ==
name	formula	weight	system	space group	unit cell	volume	density	properties	ref
	K_{3}V_{2}O_{3}F_{4}(IO_{3})_{3}	867.88	orthorhombic	Cmc2_{1}	a=11.6073 b=8.5216 c=15.098 Z=4	1493.4	3.86	SHG 1.3 ×KDP; birefringence 0.158 @ 2050 nm	
	LiFe(IO_{3})_{2}F_{2}								
	CoIO_{3}F		monoclinic	P2_{1}/n	a=4.9954 b=5.2110 c =12.5179 β=95.347°				
	NiIO_{3}F		monoclinic	P2_{1}/n					
zinc iodate fluoride	ZnIO_{3}F	259.27	monoclinic	P2_{1}/n	a=5.030 b=5.227 c=12.471 β=96.00 Z=4	326.13	5.281	band gap 4.2 eV	
	LiGaF_{2}(IO_{3})_{2}	464.46	monoclinic	P2_{1}/n	a=9.9994 b=5.1160 c=12.6619 β=106.444 Z=4	621.25	4.966	stable to 400 °C band gap 4.33 eV	
	NaGa(IO_{3})_{3}F	636.41	monoclinic	P2_{1}/c	a=14.120 b=4.9149 c=13.631 β=112.968° Z=4			band gap 4.27 eV; birefringence Δn_{exp} = 0.203 at 1064 nm	
	NaGa(IO_{3})_{2}F_{2}	480.51	monoclinic	P2_{1}/c	a=10.8243 b=4.8603 c=13.593 β=104.750° Z=4	691.6	6.615		
	RbGaF_{3}(IO_{3})		orthorhombic	Pnma	a=7.8109 b=7.2758 c=10.1367				
yttrium diiodate fluoride	Y(IO_{3})_{2}F	457.71	hexagonal	P6_{3}	a=6.8455 c=21.807 Z=6	885.0	5.153	white	
	ZrF_{2}(IO_{3})_{2}		monoclinic	C2/c	a=16.352 b=5.2819 c=7.459 β=104.31°				
	Cd_{3}(IO_{3})(IO_{4})F_{2}·0.1CdO			R3m	a =15.286 c=9.574			SHG 3.0xKDP band gap 4.0 eV	
tin difluoride diiodate	Sn(IO_{3})_{2}F_{2}	506.49	monoclinic	P2_{1}	a=5.436 b=9.91 c=6.28 β=105.44 Z=2	326.3	5.155	band gap 4.08 SHG 3x; white	
	CsVO_{2}F(IO_{3})	409.75	orthorhombic	Pna2_{1}	a=7.8974 b=10.2644 c=7.3854 Z=4	598.68	4.546	alkaline metals	
Barium iodate fluoride	Ba(IO_{3})F	331.24	monoclinic	P2_{1}/c	a=10.5729 b=6.3354 c=6.0450 β=90.497°	404.90	5.434	band gap 4.32 eV; high birefringence	
	α-Ba[VFO_{2}(IO_{3})_{2}]	589.08	Orthorhombic	Pbcn	a=5.1494 b=12.644 c=12.400 Z=4	807.4	4.846	colourless	
	β-Ba[VFO_{2}(IO_{3})_{2}]	589.08	Orthorhombic	P2_{1}2_{1}2_{1}	a=7.1902 b=8.1964 c=13.0420 Z=4	768.6	5.091	colourless	
	α-Ba_{2}[VO_{2}F_{2}(IO_{3})_{2}]IO_{3}	920.32	Orthorhombic	Pna2_{1}	a =13.578 b=11.425 c=7.500 Z=4	1163.5	5.254	colourless	
	β-Ba_{2}[VO_{2}F_{2}(IO_{3})_{2}]IO_{3}	920.32	monoclinic	P2_{1}	a=7.3895 b=7.4994 c=10.9095 β=105.461 Z=2	582.69	5.245	colourless	
	α-Ba_{2}[GaF_{4}(IO_{3})_{2}](IO_{3})	945.10	orthorhombic	Pna2_{1}	a=13.6984 b=11.3696 c=7.4245 Z=4	1156.76	5.429	colourless SHG 6×KDP band gap 4.61eV	
	β-Ba_{2}[GaF_{4}(IO_{3})_{2}](IO_{3})	945.10	monoclinic	P2_{1}	a=7.4631 b=7.4511 c=10.9597 β=106.138 Z=2	585.24	5.361	colourless SHG 6×KDP band gap 4.35	
	Ba[Sn(IO_{3})_{4}F_{2}]	993.63	monoclinic	C2/c	a=14.442 b =5.2898 c=18.17 β=112.868° Z=4	1279.5	5.158	birefringence 0.214@532 nm; band gap 4.17 eV; UV band edge 263 nm	
	LaZr(IO_{3})_{5}F_{2}		monoclinic	P2_{1}/n	a=7.5227 b=18.5262 c=10.3238 β=93.155°			band gap 4.13 eV	
	Ce(IO_{3})_{3}F		monoclinic	P2_{1}/c	a =6.9430 b =8.2205 c=29.9956 β 89.976° Z=8	1712.00	5.306		
	Ce(IO_{3})_{2}F_{2}·H_{2}O	545.94	orthorhombic	Ima2	a=7.702 b=12.277 c=7.947 Z=4	751.4	4.826	light yellow	
	Li_{2}Ce(IO_{3})_{4}F_{2}	891.60	monoclinic	C2/c	a =12.5663 b =5.5853 c=17.1623 β=95.953° Z=4	1198.07	4.943	yellow	
	CaCe(IO_{3})_{3}(IO_{3}F)F		orthorhombic	Pna2_{1}	a=11.068 b=18.151 c=6.0301				
	HfF_{2}(IO_{3})_{2}							band gap 4.11 eV	
	CsHfF_{4}(IO_{3})	562.30	orthorhombic	Ima2	a=7.4321 b=11.156 c=8.030 Z=4	665.8	5.610	SHG 3.5 × KH_{2}PO_{4} band gap 4.47 eV transparent from 270 to 9900 nm birefringence 0.161	
	K_{5}(W_{3}O_{9}F_{4})(IO_{3})	1141.95	monoclinic	Pm	a=9.7129 b=3.7122 c=10.9575 β=102.007 Z=1	386.44	4.907	SHG 11×KDP	
	PbF(IO_{3})		orthorhombic	C2ma	a = 6.0438 b = 5.7840 c = 11.0731 Z=2				
	PbF(IO_{3})		monoclinic	P11n	a=4.1581 b=4.1548 c=11.0416 β=92.47°				
	Bi(IO_{3})F_{2}	421.88	monoclinic	C2	a=12.827 b=5.3089 c=6.0790 β=101.384 Z=4	405.89	6.904	SHG 11.5×KDP	
	Bi_{3}OF_{3}(IO_{3})_{4}	1399.54	hexagonal	P6_{3}mc	a=10.880 c=6.993	716.8	6.484	colourless SHG	
	NH_{4}Bi_{2}(IO_{3})_{2}F_{5}	880.80	monoclinic	P2_{1}	a=5.718 b=5.892 c=15.18 β=100.38 Z=2	502.9	5.817	SHG 9.2×KDP	
	KBi_{2}(IO_{3})_{2}F_{5}	901.86	monoclinic	P2_{1}	a=5.687 b=5.864 c=14.82 β=100.095 Z=2	486.5	6.157	colourless SHG	
	RbBi_{2}(IO_{3})_{2}F_{5}	948.23	monoclinic	P2_{1}	a=5.7357 b=5.9095 c=15.177 β=100.263 Z=2	506.2	6.221	colourless SHG	
	CsBi_{2}(IO_{3})_{2}F_{5}	995.67	monoclinic	P2_{1}	a=5.750 b=5.924 c=15.640 β=100.509 Z=2	523.8	6.313	colourless SHG	
