= Strategic thinking =

Cognitive activity

Strategic thinking is a mental or thinking process applied by individuals and within organizations in the context of achieving a goal or set of goals.

When applied in an organizational strategic management process, strategic thinking involves the generation and application of unique business insights and opportunities intended to create competitive advantage for a firm or organization. It can be done individually, as well as collaboratively among key people who can positively alter an organization's future. Group strategic thinking may create more value by enabling a proactive and creative dialogue, where individuals gain other people's perspectives on critical and complex issues. This is regarded as a benefit in highly competitive and fast-changing business landscapes.

== Overview ==
There is a generally accepted definition for strategic thinking, a common agreement as to its role or importance, and a standardised list of key competencies of strategic thinkers. There is also a consensus on whether strategic thinking is an uncommon ideal or a common and observable property of strategy. It includes finding and developing a strategic foresight capacity for an organization, by exploring all possible organizational futures, and challenging conventional thinking to foster decision making today. Research on strategic thought indicates that the critical strategic question is not the conventional "What?", but "Why?" or "How?". The work of Henry Mintzberg and other authors, further support the conclusion; and also draw a clear distinction between strategic thinking and strategic planning, another important strategic management thought process.

General Andre Beaufre wrote in 1963 that strategic thinking "is a mental process, at once abstract and rational, which must be capable of synthesizing both psychological and material data. The strategist must have a great capacity for both analysis and synthesis; analysis is necessary to assemble the data on which he makes his diagnosis, synthesis in order to produce from these data the diagnosis itself—and the diagnosis in fact amounts to a choice between alternative courses of action."

Most agree that traditional models of strategy making, which are primarily based on strategic planning, are not working. Strategy in today's competitive business landscape is moving away from the basic 'strategic planning' to more of 'strategic thinking' in order to remain competitive. However, both thought processes must work hand-in-hand in order to reap maximum benefit. It has been argued that the real heart of strategy is the 'strategist'; and for a better strategy execution requires a strategic thinker who can discover novel, imaginative strategies which can re-write the rules of the competitive game; and set in motion the chain of events that will shape and "define the future".

== Strategic thinking vs. strategic planning ==
In the view of Fiona Graetz, strategic thinking and planning are "distinct, but interrelated and complementary thought processes" that must sustain and support one another for effective strategic management. Graetz's model holds that the role of strategic thinking is "to seek innovation and imagine new and very different futures that may lead the company to redefine its core strategies and even its industry". Strategic planning's role is "to realise and to support strategies developed through the strategic thinking process and to integrate these back into the business".

Henry Mintzberg wrote in 1994 that strategic thinking is more about synthesis (i.e., "connecting the dots") than analysis (i.e., "finding the dots"). It is about "capturing what the manager learns from all sources (both the soft insights from their personal experiences and the experiences of others throughout the organization and the hard data from market research and the like) and then synthesizing that learning into a vision of the direction that the business should pursue." Mintzberg argued that strategic thinking cannot be systematized and is the critical part of strategy formation, as opposed to strategic planning exercises. In his view, strategic planning happens around the strategy formation or strategic thinking activity, by providing inputs for the strategist to consider and providing plans for controlling the implementation of the strategy after it is formed.

According to Jeanne Liedtka, strategic thinking differs from strategic planning along the following dimensions of strategic management:

	Strategic Thinking	Strategic Planning
Vision of the Future	Only the shape of the future can be predicted.	A future that is predictable and specifiable in detail.
Strategic Formulation and Implementation	Formulation and implementation are interactive rather than sequential and discrete.	The roles of formulation and implementation can be neatly divided.
Managerial Role in Strategy Making	Lower-level managers have a voice in strategy-making, as well as greater latitude to respond opportunistically to developing conditions.	Senior executives obtain the needed information from lower-level managers, and then use it to create a plan which is, in turn, disseminated to managers for implementation.
Control	Relies on self-reference – a sense of strategic intent and purpose embedded in the minds of managers throughout the organisation that guides their choices on a daily basis in a process that is often difficult to measure and monitor from above.	Asserts control through measurement systems, assuming that organisations can measure and monitor important variables both accurately and quickly.
Managerial Role in Implementation	All managers understand the larger system, the connection between their roles and the functioning of that system, as well as the interdependence between the various roles that comprise the system.	Lower-level managers need only know their own role well and can be expected to defend only their own turf.
Strategy Making	Sees strategy and change as inescapably linked and assumes that finding new strategic options and implementing them successfully is harder and more important than evaluating them.	The challenge of setting strategic direction is primarily analytic.
Process and Outcome	Sees the planning process itself as a critical value-adding element.	Focus is on the creation of the plan as the ultimate objective.

== Strategic thinking and complexity ==
In a complex scenario, organizational actions are intensified by a global network of interactions, leading to diverse environmental, economic, and social challenges. This complexity is characterized by intricate networks and recursive cause-and-effect relationships, diverging from the linear logic of Cartesian thought and the punctual logic of dialectical thought. Within such systems, seemingly trivial actions can produce unexpected outcomes or be magnified by intricate relationship networks, resulting in entirely unpredictable consequences.

To address this context, Terra and Passador advocate for strategic thinking capable of: (1) reconnecting phenomena across different levels and disciplines and treating them holistically; (2) addressing objects of study subjected to recursive causality; (3) understanding facts through their dynamics; (4) approaching problems through mappings and negative approaches; (5) integrating non-empirical elements; and (6) incorporating a new mathematical rationale to navigate the non-linearity of such systems and the continuous transition between certainty and uncertainty inherent in their dynamics.

In the realm of academic research, Stacey suggests that this reality demands studies in the field of strategic thinking to focus on explanation, hypotheses about whole systems, their dynamics, and the relationship between dynamic behavior and innovative success. In this type of study, methods such as scheme construction, phenomenological approaches based on deductions and metaphors and integrative frameworks have been employed to understand the dynamics of various organizational problems by assimilating concepts common to several fields of science. In the field of studies on strategic thinking, several authors have developed multidisciplinary approaches based on these premises, utilizing systems thinking and cybernetics, integrative approaches, new mathematics of chaos, and concepts such as order through noise, autopoiesis, and self-organization.

== Strategic thinking competencies ==
Liedtka observed five "major attributes of strategic thinking in practice" that resemble competencies:

1. Systems perspective, refers to being able to understand implications of strategic actions. "A strategic thinker has a mental model of the complete end-to-end system of value creation, their role within it, and an understanding of the competencies it contains."
2. Intent focused which means more determined and less distractible than rivals in the marketplace. Crediting Hamel and Prahalad with popularising the concept, Liedtka describes strategic intent as "the focus that allows individuals within an organization to marshal and leverage their energy, to focus attention, to resist distraction, and to concentrate for as long as it takes to achieve a goal."
3. Thinking in time means being able to hold past, present and future in mind at the same time to create better decision making and speed implementation. "Strategy is not driven by future intent alone. It is the gap between today's reality and intent for the future that is critical." Scenario planning is a practical application for incorporating "thinking in time" into strategy making.
4. Hypothesis driven, ensuring that both creative and critical thinking are incorporated into strategy making. This competency explicitly incorporates the scientific method into strategic thinking.
5. Intelligent opportunism, which means being responsive to good opportunities. "The dilemma involved in using a well-articulated strategy to channel organisational efforts effectively and efficiently must always be balanced against the risks of losing sight of alternative strategies better suited to a changing environment."

== Strategic thinking opportunities ==
The main focus of strategic thinking is on long-term opportunities to achieve a purpose, goal, or set of goals, the broad view of opportunities includes taking a look at the entirety of a concept instead of merely focusing on individual details and seeing beyond the details to focus on the larger vision or organizational goals to produce long-term successes.

Big-picture thinking involves:

- Envisioning the long term implications of decisions. Thinking about the long-term impact or implications means we take a wide-angle lens to discover all opportunities to achieve a purpose, goal, or a set of goals.
- Identifying patterns. Looking for connections and patterns beyond the immediate situation.
- Creating psychological distance. Creating distance from a decision, either in time or situationally.
- Goal-directed behaviour and action towards an ideal future. Focusing on the overall vision and macro-level aspects of a project or decision.
- Cross-functional collaboration. Working with multiple teams to put the big-picture thinking into practice.
- There are six exercises to do strategic thinking, which include; reflection, ditch perfectionism, consider other perspectives, use a mind mapping tool, ask tough questions and brainstorm, stay focused on purpose.

Strategic thinking is one type of thinking, the ability to develop and implement long-term plans to achieve goals. Analytical thinking is a foundation of strategic thinking. Many of the types of thinking that we could utilise include:

- Analytical thinking
- Strategic thinking
- Strategic planning
- Creative thinking
- Intuitive thinking
- Systems thinking

== See also ==
- U.S. Army Strategist, functional area in the U.S Army with strategists of diverse and advanced educations and a focus on creative and critical thinking
