= Simon Shnoll =

Russian biophysicist (1930–2021)

Simon Elievich Shnol
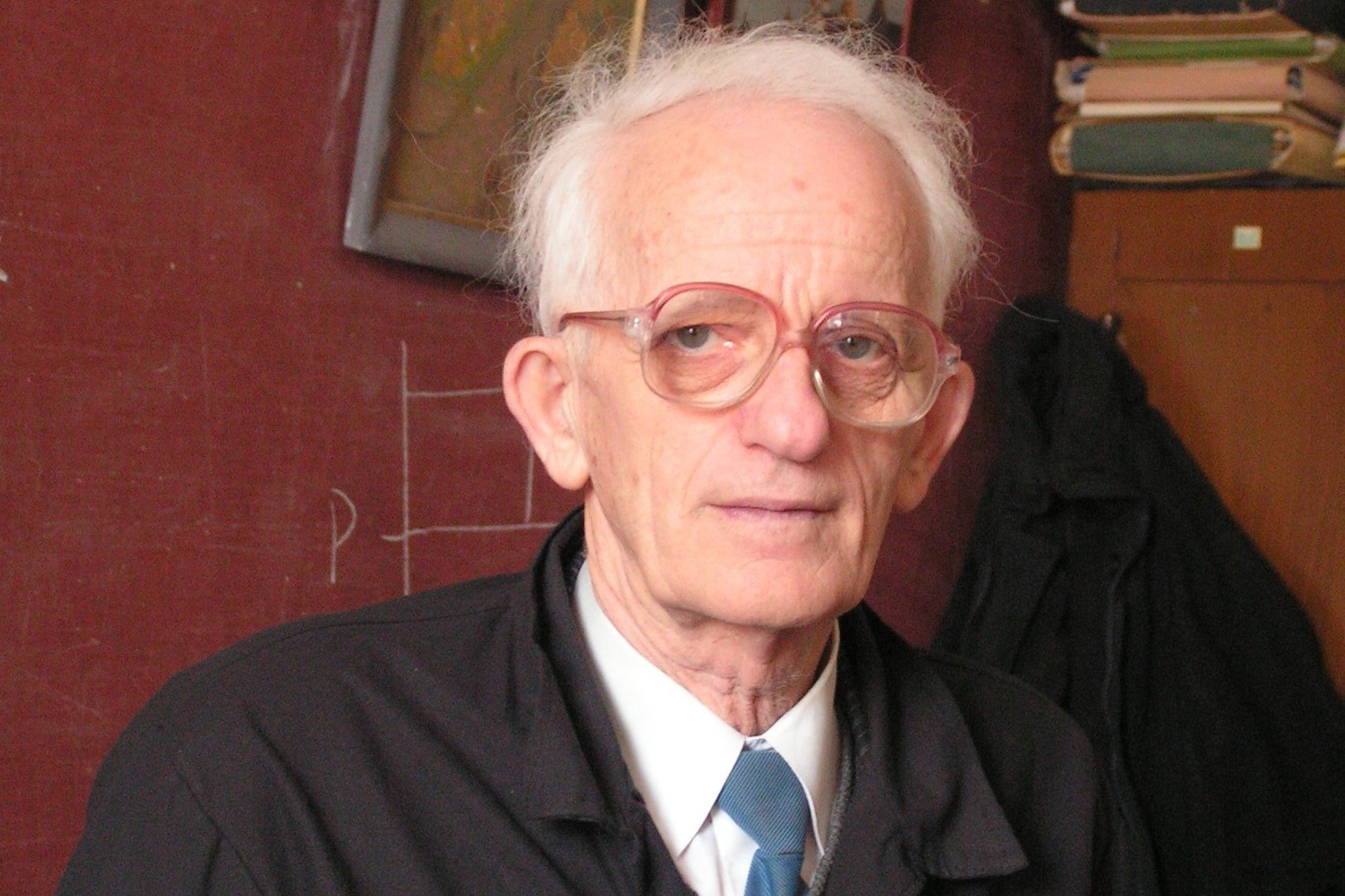
- Shnoll in 2007
- Born: 21 March 1930; Moscow, Russian SFSR, Soviet Union
- Died: 11 September 2021 (aged 91)
- Education: Doctor of Science (1970)
- Alma mater: Moscow State University
- Scientific career
- Fields: Biochemistry, Biophysics
- Workplaces: Moscow State University
- Thesis: Spontaneous reversible changes ("conformational vibrations") of preparations of muscle proteins
- Doctoral students: Anatol Zhabotinsky

Simon El'evich Shnol (Russian: Симон Эльевич Шноль; 21 March 1930 – 11 September 2021) was a biophysicist, and a historian of Soviet science. He was a professor at Physics Department of Moscow State University and a member of Russian Academy of Natural Sciences. His fields of interest were the oscillatory processes in biology, the theory of evolution, chronobiology, and the history of science. He had mentored many successful scientists, including Anatoly Zhabotinsky.

== Biography ==
Simon Shnoll was born in Moscow in 1930. His father was Eli Gershevich Shnol, a linguist and philosopher. His mother was Faina Yakovlevna Yudovich, a teacher of Russian language and literature. In 1946, he was enrolled to Moscow State University (MSU). After graduation, he was engaged in developing new methods for using radioactive isotopes in medicine, in the Central Institute for Improvement of Medicine in Moscow, where he worked until 1959. In 1960 he went to work at MSU. Since 1975 he taught as a Professor of Biophysics. Since 1963, he was the head of Laboratory of Physical Biochemistry at the Institute of Biophysics in Pushchino. The first scientific papers were devoted to ATPases and the use of radioactive isotopes in experimental and clinical studies. He was married and has a son, Alexey Kondrashov.

== Research ==
From 1954 to 1957, Shnoll demonstrated a high probability of oscillatory modes in biochemical reactions. Study of chemical oscillating reactions conducted under his direction gained prominence to his graduate student Anatoly Zhabotinsky, who investigated in detail the reaction previously discovered by Boris Belousov. He later worked in the fields of Chronobiology and Astrobiology.

He was the author of over 200 scientific papers. He was also author of the books "Physico-chemical factors of biological evolution" (1979) and "Heroes, villains, and conformists of Russian Science" (2001). He mentored 70 successful PhD students. A minor planet «Shnollia» was named after him.

During many years, Simon Shnoll was a jury chairman on Biology Olympiads conducted at Moscow State University. He was a member of editorial board of Russian journal "Priroda" ("Nature").

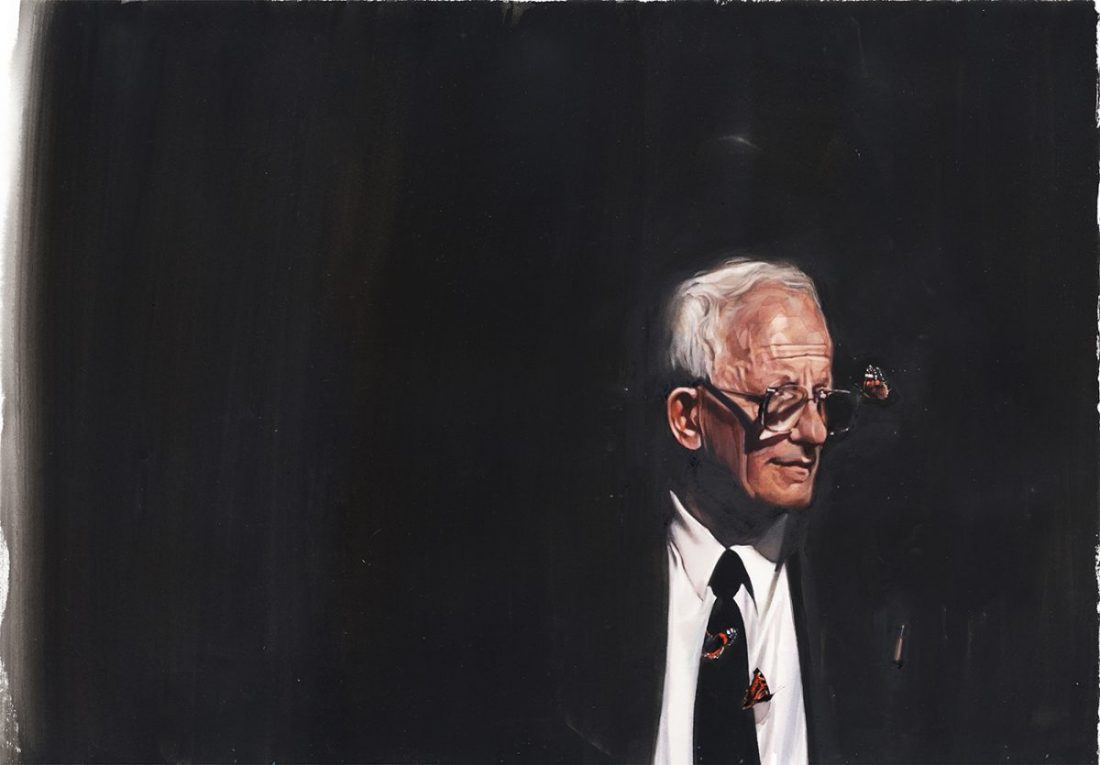
Portrait of Simon Shnoll by the artist Dima Rebus "Good Morning Dr. Shnoll" (2017) Watercolor on paper, chemical solutions, rainwater

== Selected publications ==
- S. Shnoll Physico-chemical factors of biological evolution. - Moscow: Nauka, 1979. - 263.
- S. Shnoll Cosmophysical factors in random processes . - Stockholm (Sweden): Svenska fysikarkivat, 2009. - 388. - ISBN 978-91-85917-06-8

== See also ==
- Belousov–Zhabotinsky reaction
