= Old Nassau (disambiguation) =

"Old Nassau" is Princeton University's alma mater (school song).

It may also refer to:

- Old Nassau County Courthouse (New York), an historic two-story courthouse building in Nassau County, New York, U.S.
- Old Nassau reaction, a chemical clock reaction in which a clear solution turns orange and then black

== See also ==
- Nassau (disambiguation)
