= Iodate sulfate =

Iodate sulfates are mixed anion compounds that contain both iodate and sulfate anions. Iodate sulfates have been investigated as optical second harmonic generators, and for separation of rare earth elements. Related compounds include the iodate selenates and chromate iodates.

Iodate sulfates can be produced from water solutions of iodic acid and sulfate salts.

== List ==
formula	name	formula weight	system	space group	cell Å	volume	density	comments	ref
Na_{7}(IO_{3})(SO_{4})_{3}		624.01	orthorhombic	P2_{1}2_{1}2_{1}	a=6.839 b=10.851 c=18.519 Z=4	1374.2	3.016	at 100K; band gap 4.83; SHQ 0.5×KDP; birefringence 0.075 at 1064 nm	
Na_{9}(IO_{3})(SO_{4})_{4}	Hectorfloresite		monoclinic	P2_{1}/a	a = 18.775 b = 6.9356 c = 14.239 β = 108.91° Z = 4				
K_{2}SO_{4}·HIO_{3}		350.17	monoclinic	P2_{1}/n	a=7.4215 b=7.1578 c=13.802 β=93.330° Z=4	731.9	3.178	colourless; birefingence 0.14 at 589.3 nm; UV edge 275 nm	
K_{3}Na_{5}Mg_{5}(IO_{3})_{6}(SO_{4})_{6}(H_{2}O)_{5}			trigonal	P3̅c1					
K_{7.2}Na_{8.8}Mg_{10}(IO_{3})_{12}(SO_{4})_{12}(H_{2}O)_{12}	Fuenzalidaite		trigonal	P3̅c1	a = 9.4643 c = 27.336	2,120.52		colourless; Uniaxial (-) n_{ω} = 1.622 n_{ε} = 1.615; Birefringence = 0.007	
Y(IO_{3})(SO_{4})·3H_{2}O			orthorhombic	P2_{1}2_{1}2_{1}	a=6.6961 b=8.7941 c=13.647			SHG 0.7 × KDP@1064 nm; birefringence 0.118@532 nm; band gap 4.60 eV	
Nb_{2}O_{3}(IO_{3})_{2}(SO_{4})		679.68	monoclinic	P2_{1}	a=5.299 b=20.479 c=5.452 β=119.095° Z=2	517.0	4.366	band gap 3.25; SHG 6 × KDP; birefringence 0.22 at 1064 nm; stable below 580 °C	
Ce(IO_{3})_{2}(SO_{4})	CISO	585.98	orthorhombic	P2_{1}2_{1}2_{1}	a=7.5366 b=8.9787 c=11.6121 Z=4	785.78	4.953	yellow; SHG 3.5 × KDP; birefringence 0.259 at 546 nm	
Sm(IO_{3})(SO_{4})			monoclinic	P2_{1}/c	a=9.3148 b=6.8678 c=8.2852 β=104.701°				
Sm_{2}(IO_{3})_{3}(SO_{4})OH·3H_{2}O			triclinic	P1̅	a 7.3858 b 9.6166 c 11.8629 α=66.482° β=76.884° γ=69.101°				
Eu(IO_{3})(SO_{4})			monoclinic	P2_{1}/c	a=9.3083 b=6.8460 c=8.2575 β=104.696°				
Eu(IO_{3})(SO_{4})·3H_{2}O			orthorhombic	P2_{1}2_{1}2_{1}	a=6.781 b=8.915 c=13.810				
Eu_{2}(IO_{3})_{3}(SO_{4})OH·3H_{2}O			triclinic	P1̅	a=7.3666 b=9.5817 c=11.8263 α=66.5365° β=76.8591° γ=69.1131°				
Gd(IO_{3})(SO_{4})·3H_{2}O			orthorhombic	P2_{1}2_{1}2_{1}	a=6.7498 b=8.8689 c=13.7695				
Dy(IO_{3})(SO_{4})(H_{2}O)			orthorhombic	P2_{1}2_{1}2_{1}	a=7.3088 b=9.4824 c=11.7302 α=66.6573° β=76.8745° γ=69.2970°				
Dy(IO_{3})(SO_{4})(H_{2}O)_{3}			orthorhombic	P2_{1}2_{1}2_{1}	a=6.682 b=8.791 c=13.632				
Dy_{2}(IO_{3})_{3}(SO_{4})OH·3H_{2}O			triclinic	P1̅					
Ho(IO_{3})(SO_{4})·3H_{2}O			orthorhombic	P2_{1}2_{1}2_{1}	a=6.7098 b=8.8093 c=13.6558				
Er(IO_{3})(SO_{4})·3H_{2}O			orthorhombic	P2_{1}2_{1}2_{1}	a=6.6822 b=8.7719 c=13.6104				
Hg_{2}(IO_{3})_{2}(SO_{4})			monoclinic	C2/c	a=12.040 b=4.7133 c=15.533 β=102.43°				
Hg_{2}(IO_{3})_{2}(SO_{4})(H_{2}O)			monoclinic	C2	a=11.767 b=4.9190 c=7.8076 β=97.10°			band gap 3.98 eV; SHG 6 × KDP; dehydrate 250 °C	
Bi(IO_{3})(SO_{4})		479.94	monoclinic	P2_{1}/c	a=9.4355 b=6.9168 c=8.3374 β=105.168° Z=4	525.17	6.070	band gap 3.91 eV; birefringence 0.087 at 1064 nm; colourless	
Bi_{2}O(SO_{4})(IO_{3})_{2}			monoclinic	P2_{1}/n	a=7.2391 b=17.907 c=7.7964 β = 109.652° Z =4				
AgBi(SO_{4})(IO_{3})_{2}		1525.42	triclinic	P1	a=5.5189 b=6.9129 c=11.8527 α=90.598° β=92.151° γ=109.895° Z=1	424.78	5.963	colourless; SHG 3.0 × KDP	
CdBi(IO_{3})(SO_{4})_{2}		688.40	monoclinic	P2_{1}/c	a=12.777 b=6.8491 c=9.984 β=103.23° Z=4	850.5	5.376	band gap 4.03 eV; birefringence 0.100 at 1064 nm	
