= Jeanne Liedtka =

American professor of business administration (born 1955)

Jeanne M. Liedtka
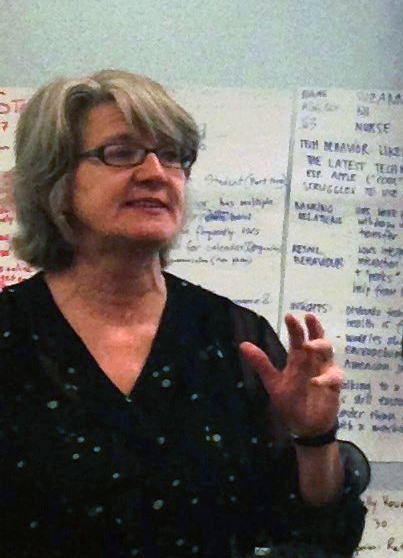
- Jeanne M. Liedtka teaching
- Born: March 2, 1955 (age 71); Trenton, New Jersey, United States
- Education: Darden School of the University of Virginia
- Scientific career
- Fields: American Strategist and Professor of Business Administration

Jeanne M. Liedtka, OAM (born March 2, 1955) is an American strategist and professor of business administration at the Darden School of the University of Virginia, particularly known for her work on strategic thinking, design thinking and organic growth.

== Biography ==
Born in Trenton, New Jersey, Liedtka received a B.A. in accounting from Boston University in 1976, an M.B.A from Harvard Business School and a D.B.A. in management policy from Boston University in 1988.

She taught previously at Simmons College and at Rutgers University, and is United Technologies Chaired Professor of Innovation and Design Thinking at the Darden School of Business, University of Virginia.

== Work ==
Liedtka is particularly known for her work in corporate strategy. Beginning her career as a strategy consultant with the Boston Consulting Group, she has written and consulted on topics surrounding strategic thinking for over 30 years. Formerly the Executive Director of the School's Batten Institute, a foundation established to develop thought leadership in the fields of entrepreneurship and corporate innovation, Liedtka has also served as Chief Learning Officer for the United Technologies Corporation (UTC), headquartered in Hartford, Connecticut, and as the Associate Dean of the MBA Program at Darden.

=== Design thinking ===
Liedtka's work on design thinking is presented in her book, Designing for Growth: A design toolkit for managers, co-authored with Tim Ogilvie, that won the 1800 CEO READ best management book of 2011. Her recent research in design thinking is published in her two new books; Solving Problems with Design Thinking: Ten Stories of What Works, co-authored with Andrew King and Kevin Bennett; and The Designing for Growth Field Book: A Step-by-Step Project Guide, co-authored with Tim Ogilvie and Rachel Brozenske She has also published Design Thinking for the Greater Good: Innovation in the Social Sector, book aiming for design thinking in social field.

=== Organic growth ===
Organic growth has been a focus for Liedtka's work that is described in her book The Catalyst: How You Can Lead Extraordinary Growth co-authored with Bob Rosen and Robert Wiltbank. Based on a multiple year study of operating managers who excelled at producing revenue growth in mature organizations. The Catalyst was named one of Business Week magazine's best innovation and design books of 2009. In 2012, she published another book on growth, The Physics of Business Growth, co-authored with her Darden colleague, Professor Ed Hess

=== Strategic thinking ===
Liedtka's work in strategic thinking has focused in two areas: One is in identifying and exploring five central elements that distinguish strategic thinking in practice : it incorporates a holistic systems perspective, it is possibility and intent-focused, involves thinking in time, is hypothesis-driven, and is intelligently opportunistic. Her second contribution has been in distinguishing between strategic thinking and strategic planning. In this work, she has suggested what a more "generative" planning process, that encouraged strategic thinking, might look like. She has argued for the need to move beyond strategic thinking, to incorporate a broader notion of strategy as experienced. She currently runs the course Design Thinking for Business Innovation on Coursera.

== Latest publications ==
- "Moving Design from Metaphor or Management Practice," with B. Parmar, Journal of Organizational Design, December, 2012.
- "Helping Managers to Discover Their Appetite for Design Thinking", with T. Ogilvie, Design Management Review, 2012, pp. 7–13.
- "Learning to use design thinking tools for successful innovation", Strategy and Leadership, Vol. 39, No.5: 13–19, 2011.
- "The Influence of Design Thinking in Business: Some Preliminary Observations", with S. Carr, A Halliday, A. King, T. Lochwood, Design Management Review, 2010.
- "Business Strategy and Design: Can this marriage be saved?" Design Management Review, pp. 7–11, 2010.
- "Beyond Strategic Thinking: Strategy as Experienced and Embodied," Ch.9 in Disruptive Business, (editor, Alexander Manu), Gower Publishing, 2010
- "Strategy as Design", DOM Research Lab Publication (Ed. M. Mr. Shamiyeh) Volume 4, 2010
- "Getting to Growth: The organization as its own worst enemy", with R. Rosen and R. Wiltbank Ivey Business Journal, Mar/Apr 2009.73 (2)]
