= Fluoroiodate =

Class of chemical compounds

A fluorooxoiodate or fluoroiodate is a chemical compound or ion derived from iodate, by substituting some of the oxygen by fluorine. They have iodine in the +5 oxidation state. The iodine atoms have a stereochemically active lone-pair of electrons. Many are non-centrosymmetric, and are second harmonic generators (SHG) of intense light shining through them. They are under investigation as materials for non-linear optics, such as for generating ultraviolet light from visible or infrared lasers.

Different ions include [IOF_{4}]^{−}, [IO_{2}F_{2}]^{−}, [IO_{3}F]^{2−}, and [I_{2}O_{5}F_{2}]^{2−}.

They are distinct from the iodate fluorides which are mixed anion compounds that do not have fluorine-iodine bonds.

== Properties ==
Fluoroiodates are transparent in visible, longer wave ultraviolet and some of the infrared electromagnetic bands.

Compared to iodate, the I-O bonds are shorter, and I-F bonds are longer in fluoroiodates. The I-F bond is about 0.2 Å longer than the I-O bond. The fluorine atoms repel each other in [IO_{2}F_{2}]^{−} and are almost opposite each other. The ∠OIF angle is close to 90° and the oxygen atoms ∠OFO are at about 102°, so they resemble an octahedral arrangement, with two adjacent positions deleted.

== List ==
formula	crystal	space group	unit cell	volume	density	band gap eV	SHG × KDP 1064 nm	comment	reference
NH_{4}IO_{2}F_{2}	orthorhombic	Pca2_{1}	a=8.639 b=6.166 c=8.629 Z=4	459.7		4.53	1.2		
(NH_{4})_{3}(IO_{2}F_{2})_{3}·H_{2}O	orthorhombic	Pnma	a=15.102 b=12.685 c=7.369 Z=4	1411.8		4.55	no		
[C(NH_{2})_{3}]^{+}[IO_{2}F_{2}]^{–}	triclinic	P1̅	a = 6.6890 b = 10.2880 c = 10.30.92 α = 105.447 β = 108.568 γ = 91.051° Z=4	644.08	2.650	4.81		explosive; birefringence Δn = 0.110	
(C(NH_{2})_{3})_{2}(I_{2}O_{5}F)(IO_{3})(H_{2}O)	monoclinic	P2_{1}/c	a=7.4388 b=19.2679 c=11.0753 β=106.289° Z=4	1523.70		4.49		birefringence Δn = 0.068	
C_{5}N_{2}H_{7})IO_{2}F_{2} (4-aminopyridine)	monoclinic	C2/m	a=7.4919 b=17.6990 c=6.3050 β=98.893° Z=4	825.99	2.348	4.06		birefringence 0.30 @ 550 nm	
(C_{3}N_{6}H_{8})(IO_{2}F_{2})_{2} (melamine)	monoclinic	C2/c	a=19.8063 b=8.0742 c=7.2996 β=96.819° Z=4	1159.09	2.991	4.10		birefringence 0.23 @ 550 nm	
NaIO_{2}F_{2}	orthorhombic	Cmcm	a=6.929 b=7.274 c=7.350 Z=4	370.42			0		
KIO_{2}F_{2}	orthorhombic	Pca2_{1}	a=8.3943 b=5.9792 c=8.4468 Z=4	423.95			0	ferroelastic; when compressed on 001 axis IO_{2}F_{2} units rotate with abc transforming to cba;	
CoIO_{3}F	monoclinic	P2_{1}/n	a=4.9954 b=5.2110 c=12.5179 β=95.347°						
NiIO_{3}F	monoclinic	P2_{1}/n							
ZnIO_{3}F	monoclinic	P2_{1}/m				4.2	0.00	birefringence 0.219 at 546 nm	
[GaF(H_{2}O)][IO_{3}F]	orthorhombic	Pca2_{1}	a=13.954 b=6.9261 c=4.7629			4.34	10	laser damage threshold 298.40 MW cm^{−2}; decompose 300 °C; dipole moment density: 0.0908 D Å^{−3}	
NaGaI_{3}O_{9}F	monoclinic	P2_{1}/c	_a=14.120 b=4.9149 c=13.63 β=112.968° Z=4	871.0	4.853	4.27	0	_{∞}[Ga_{2}(IO_{3}F)_{2}(IO_{3})_{4}]^{2−} layers sandwiching Na^{+}; birefringence Δn_{exp} ~ 0.203 at 1064 nm	
RbIO_{2}F_{2}	orthorhombic	Pca2_{1}	a=8.567 b=6.151 c=8.652 Z=4	455.92		4.2	4		
SrI_{2}O_{5}F_{2}	monoclinic	P2_{1}/c	a=10.462 b=7.272 c=8.306 β=109.699° Z=4	594.9		3.68	0		
Sr_{4}O(IO_{3})_{3}(I_{3}O_{7}F_{3})BF_{4}		R3c	a=9.7216 c=38.759					absorption band at 250 nm; decompose 380 °C	
CdIO_{3}F		P2_{1}2_{1}2_{1}				4.22	6.2		
Rb_{2}MoO_{2}F_{3}(IO_{2}F_{2})	orthorhombic	Cmc2_{1}	a 11.806 b 10.128 c 7.6661			3.77	5		
CsIO_{2}F_{2}	orthorhombic	Pca2_{1}	a=8.781 b=6.377 c=8.868 Z=4	496.58		4.5	3		
Cs_{3}(IO_{2}F_{2})_{3}•H_{2}O		Pnma				3.37	0		
Cs(IO_{2}F_{2})_{2}•H_{2}O•H3O	monoclinic	P2_{1}/c				2.77	0		
CsIO_{4}		Pnma					0		
Cs_{2}VOF_{4}(IO_{2}F_{2})	orthorhombic	Cmc2_{1}	a=12.188 b=10.349 c=7.779 Z=4	981.2	4.100	2.88	5	yellow at 1064 nm	
Cs_{2}MoO_{2}F_{3}(IO_{2}F_{2})	orthorhombic	Cmc2_{1}	a =12.2153 b =10.4656 c =7.8560			3.43	4.5		
BaIO_{3}F	monoclinic	P2_{1}/c				4.32	0		
Ba(IO_{2}F_{2})_{2}	monoclinic	P2_{1}/c	a=10.747 b=7.161 c=9.086 β=93.748° Z=4	697.7		3.99	0	UV cut off 230 nm	
BaI_{2}O_{5}F_{2}	monoclinic	P2_{1}/c	a=10.750 b=7.599 c=8.598 β=109.753°					birefringence Δn= 0.174 at 1064 nm	
BaIO_{2}F_{3}	orthorhombic	Cmca	a=6.334 b=6.343 c=23.300			4.27	0	birefringence Δn=0.133 at 1064 nm	
Ba_{2}[GaF_{5}(IO_{3}F)]	monoclinic	P2_{1}/c	a=7.5065 b=7.4160 c=14.5932 β=100.363°					birefringence Δn=0.068 at 550 nm; UV edge 230 nm; transparent 0.34–11.9 μm	
CaCe(IO_{3})_{3}(IO_{3}F)F	orthorhombic	Pna2_{1}	a=11.068 b=18.15 c=6.0301 Z=4	1211.3	5.033	2,72	5	pale-yellow; birefringence 0.071 at 1064 nm SHG 5×KDP at 1064 nm	
Rb_{2}WO_{2}F_{3}(IO_{2}F_{2})	orthorhombic	Cmc2_{1}	a=11.726 b=10.188 c=7.666			4.42			
Cs_{2}WO_{2}F_{3}(IO_{2}F_{2})	orthorhombic	Cmc2_{1}	a=12.1122 b=10.6192 c =7.8333			4.29			
Pb_{4}O(IO_{3})_{3}(I_{3}O_{7}F_{3})BF_{4}		R3c	a =9.8184 c =38.867					absorption band at 283 nm; decomposes 300 °C	
