= Chemical oscillator =

Reacting chemical mixture in which the concentrations change periodically

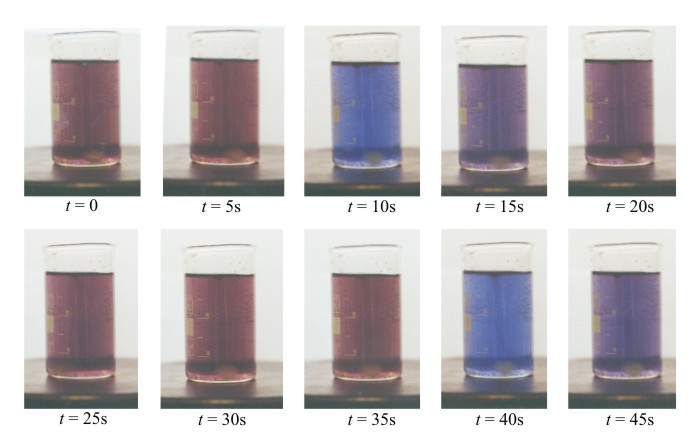
A stirred BZ reaction mixture showing changes in color over time

In chemistry, a chemical oscillator is a complex mixture of reacting chemical compounds in which the concentration of one or more components exhibits periodic changes. They are a class of reactions that serve as an example of non-equilibrium thermodynamics with far-from-equilibrium behavior. The reactions are theoretically important in that they show that chemical reactions do not have to be dominated by equilibrium thermodynamic behavior.

In cases where one of the reagents has a visible color, periodic color changes can be observed. Examples of oscillating reactions are the Belousov–Zhabotinsky reaction (BZ reaction), the Briggs–Rauscher reaction, and the Bray–Liebhafsky reaction.

== History ==
The earliest scientific evidence that such reactions can oscillate was met with extreme scepticism. In 1828, G.T. Fechner published a report of oscillations in a chemical system. He described an electrochemical cell that produced an oscillating current. In 1899, W. Ostwald observed that the rate of chromium dissolution in acid periodically increased and decreased. Both of these systems were heterogeneous and it was believed then, and through much of the last century, that homogeneous oscillating systems were nonexistent. While theoretical discussions date back to around 1910, the systematic study of oscillating chemical reactions and of the broader field of non-linear chemical dynamics did not become well established until the mid-1970s.

== Theory ==
Chemical systems cannot oscillate about a position of final equilibrium because such an oscillation would violate the second law of thermodynamics. For a thermodynamic system which is not at equilibrium, this law requires that the system approach equilibrium and not recede from it. For a closed system at constant temperature and pressure, the thermodynamic requirement is that the Gibbs free energy must decrease continuously and not oscillate. However it is possible that the concentrations of some reaction intermediates oscillate, and also that the rate of formation of products oscillates.

Theoretical models of oscillating reactions have been studied by chemists, physicists, and mathematicians. In an oscillating system the energy-releasing reaction can follow at least two different pathways, and the reaction periodically switches from one pathway to another. One of these pathways produces a specific intermediate, while another pathway consumes it. The concentration of this intermediate triggers the switching of pathways. When the concentration of the intermediate is low, the reaction follows the producing pathway, leading then to a relatively high concentration of intermediate. When the concentration of the intermediate is high, the reaction switches to the consuming pathway.

Different theoretical models for this type of reaction have been created, including the Lotka-Volterra model, the Brusselator and the Oregonator. The latter was designed to simulate the Belousov-Zhabotinsky reaction.

== Types ==
=== Belousov–Zhabotinsky (BZ) reaction ===
A Belousov–Zhabotinsky reaction is one of several oscillating chemical systems, whose common element is the inclusion of bromine and an acid. An essential aspect of the BZ reaction is its so-called "excitability"—under the influence of stimuli, patterns develop in what would otherwise be a perfectly quiescent medium. Some clock reactions such as the Briggs–Rauscher reactions and the BZ using the chemical ruthenium bipyridyl as catalyst can be excited into self-organising activity through the influence of light.

Boris Belousov first noted, sometime in the 1950s, that in a mix of potassium bromate, cerium(IV) sulfate, propanedioic acid (another name for malonic acid) and citric acid in dilute sulfuric acid, the ratio of concentration of the cerium(IV) and cerium(III) ions oscillated, causing the colour of the solution to oscillate between a yellow solution and a colorless solution. This is due to the cerium(IV) ions being reduced by propanedioic acid to cerium(III) ions, which are then oxidized back to cerium(IV) ions by bromate(V) ions.

=== Briggs–Rauscher reaction ===
The Briggs–Rauscher oscillating reaction is especially well suited for demonstration purposes because of its visually striking color changes: the freshly prepared colorless solution slowly turns an amber color, suddenly changing to a very dark blue. This slowly fades to colorless and the process repeats, about ten times in the most popular formulation.

=== Bray–Liebhafsky reaction ===
The Bray–Liebhafsky reaction is a chemical clock first described by W. C. Bray in 1921 with the oxidation of iodine to iodate:

5 H_{2}O_{2} + I_{2} → 2 IO^{−}_{3} + 2 H^{+} + 4 H_{2}O

and the reduction of iodate back to iodine:

5 H_{2}O_{2} + 2 IO^{−}_{3} + 2 H^{+} → I_{2} + 5 O_{2} + 6 H_{2}O

== See also ==
- Catalytic oscillator
- Mercury beating heart
- Blue bottle experiment
- Clock reactions
