= Anatol Zhabotinsky =

Anatol M. Zhabotinsky
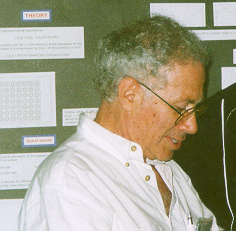
- Anatol M. Zhabotinsky at the American Chemical Society Meeting in New Orleans in 1999
- Born: January 17, 1938; Moscow, Soviet Union
- Died: September 16, 2008 (aged 70); Boston
- Known for: Belousov–Zhabotinsky reaction
- Scientific career
- Workplaces: Moscow State University, Brandeis University
- Doctoral advisor: Simon Shnoll

Anatol Markovich Zhabotinsky (Анато́лий Ма́ркович Жаботи́нский) (January 17, 1938 – September 16, 2008) was a Soviet biophysicist who created a theory of the chemical clock known as Belousov–Zhabotinsky reaction in the 1960s and published a comprehensive body of experimental data on chemical wave propagation and pattern formation in nonuniform media. The reaction had been discovered by Boris Pavlovich Belousov in the early 1950s. From 1991 until his death, Zhabotinsky was an adjunct professor of chemistry at Brandeis University in Waltham, Massachusetts.
