= Dicinnamalacetone =

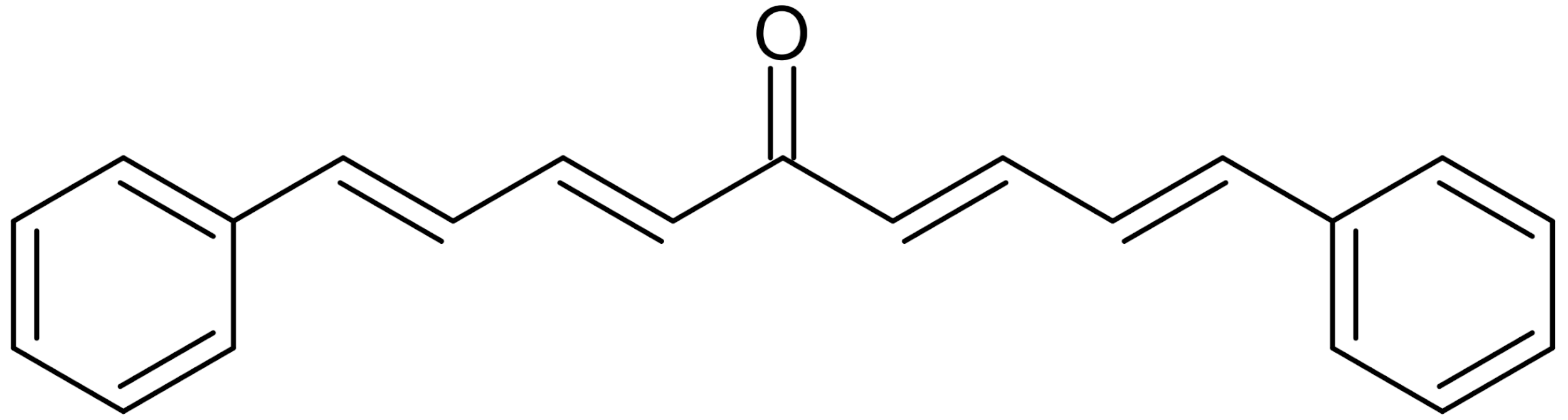

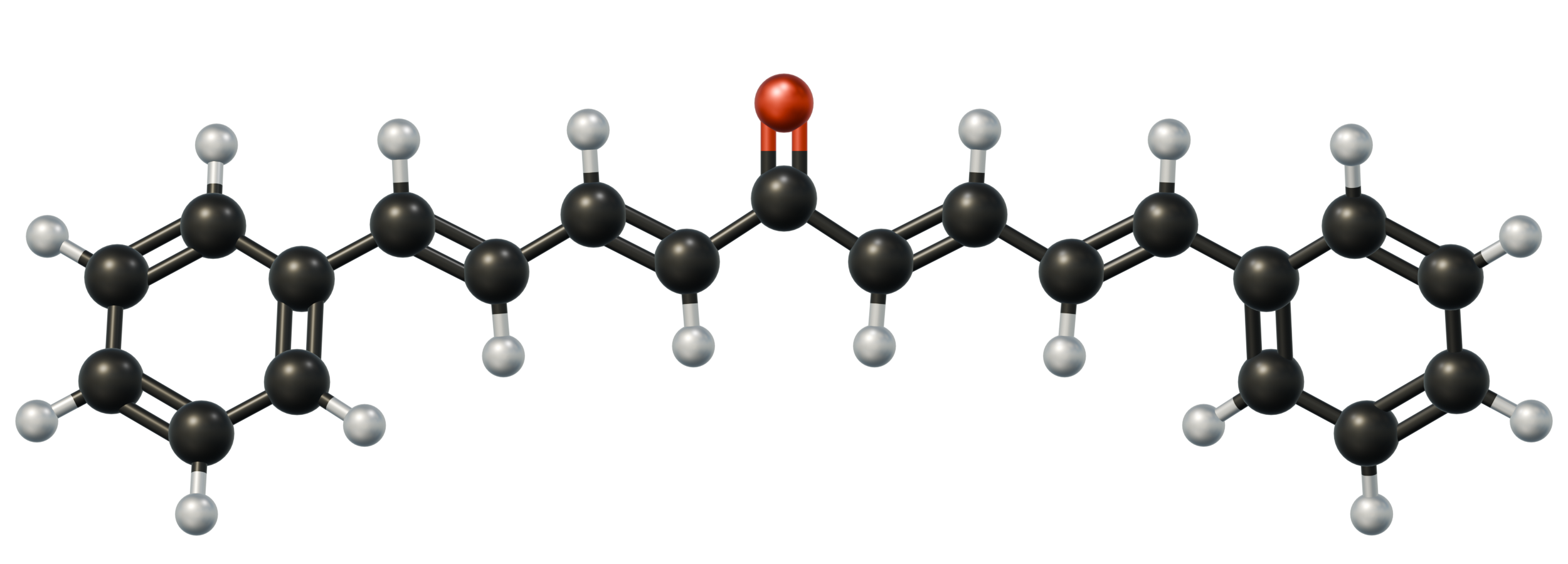

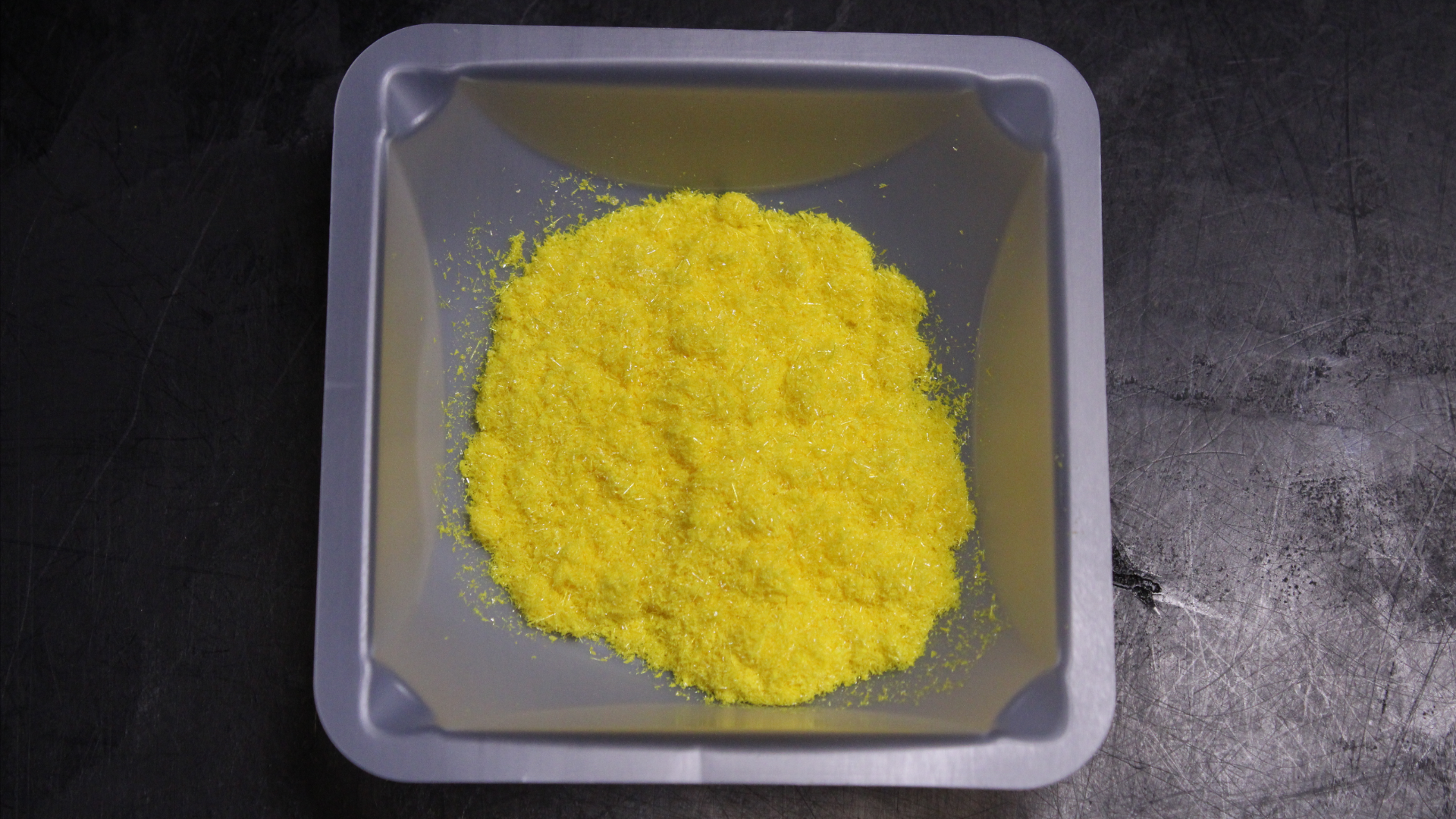

Names
- Systematic IUPAC name (1E,3E,6E,8E)-1,9-Diphenyl-1,3,6,8-nonatetraen-5-one
- Other names: Dicinnamylideneacetone; 1,9-diphenyl-1,3,6,8-nonatetraen-5-one

Identifiers
CAS Number	622-21-9
3D model (JSmol)	Interactive image
ChEMBL	ChEMBL388544
ChemSpider	4527132
EC Number	210-724-0
PubChem CID	5378259
- InChI: InChI=1S/C21H18O/c22-21(17-9-7-15-19-11-3-1-4-12-19)18-10-8-16-20-13-5-2-6-14-20/h1-18H/b15-7+,16-8+,17-9+,18-10+ Key: RLJALOQFYHCJKG-FVRNMFRHSA-N
- SMILES: C1=CC=C(C=C1)/C=C/C=C/C(=O)/C=C/C=C/C2=CC=CC=C2

Properties
Chemical formula	C_{21}H_{18}O
Molar mass	286.374 g·mol^{−1}
Appearance	Yellow crystalline solid
Melting point	143 °C (289 °F; 416 K)
- Except where otherwise noted, data are given for materials in their standard state (at 25 °C [77 °F], 100 kPa). Infobox references

Dicinnamalacetone is a conjugated organic compound. It is used as an indicator for the presence of hydrogen halides in solvents, and its preparation is used as an example of the aldol condensation in organic chemistry teaching labs.

== Preparation ==
Dicinnamalacetone (specifically the all-trans isomer) may be prepared by the reaction of acetone and trans-cinnamaldehyde catalyzed by a strong base, such as potassium hydroxide. The reaction is typically conducted in a mixture of water and ethanol.

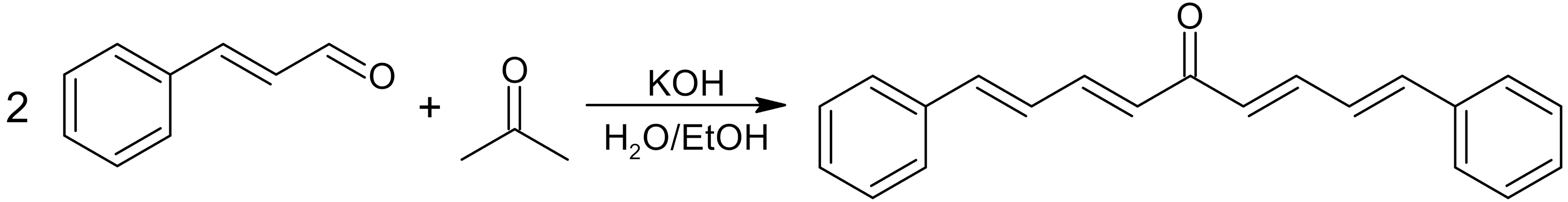

=== Clock reaction ===
The preparation of dicinnamalacetone is an example of a clock reaction. Upon the addition of acetone to a solution of trans-cinnamaldehyde and potassium hydroxide in ethanol and water, a precipitate of dicinnamalacetone forms spontaneously after a delay.

The formation of dicinnamalacetone constitutes two separate aldol condensations. In the first, one molar equivalent of trans-cinnamaldehyde and one molar equivalent of acetone condense to form a soluble intermediate compound:

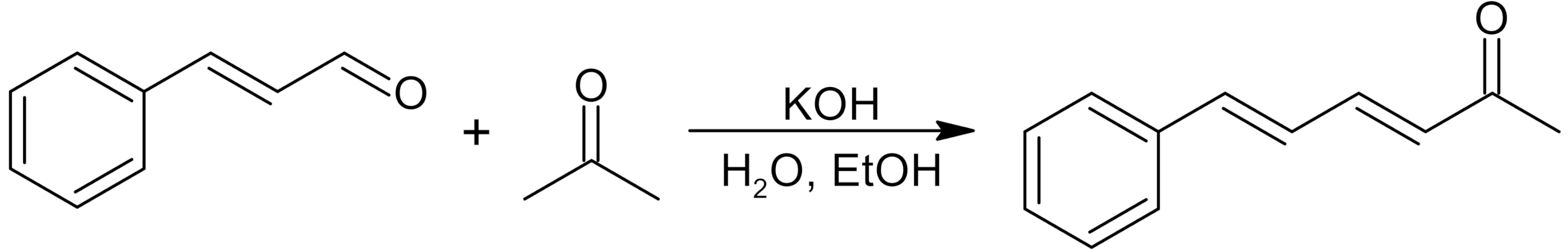

This intermediate compound then condenses with another molar equivalent of trans-cinnamaldehyde to form dicinnamalacetone, which is insoluble in the reaction mixture:

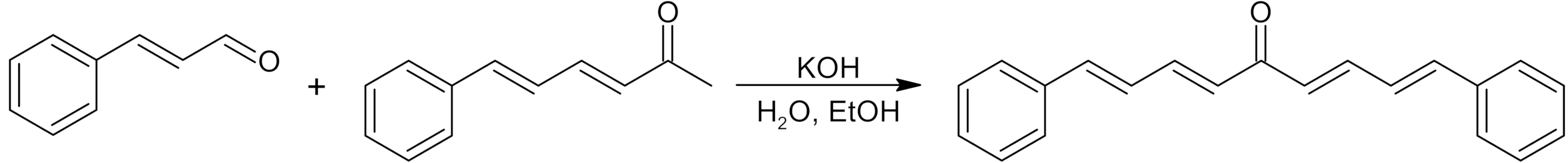

The first condensation is believed to be relatively slow compared to the second, hence the delay between the addition of all of the reactants and the formation of a precipitate.
