= Chemical garden =

Demonstration of metallic salts crystallization

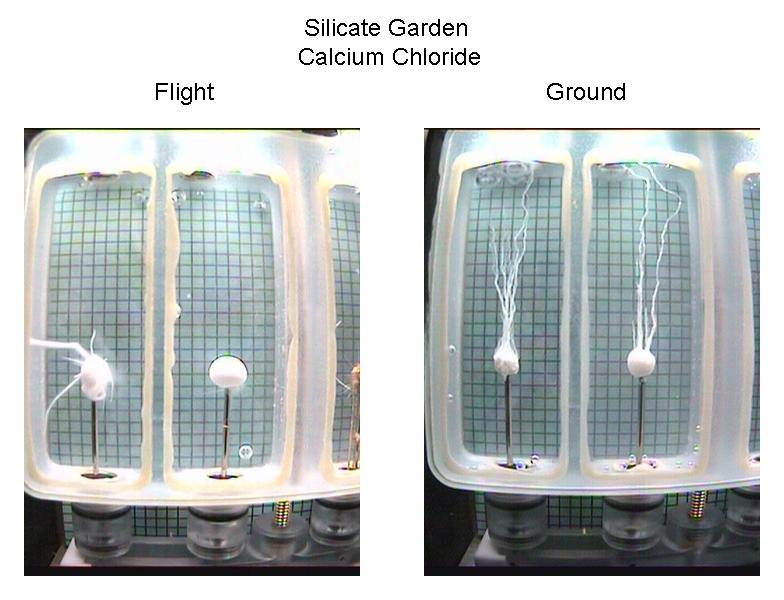
Comparison of chemical gardens grown by NASA scientists on the International Space Station (left) and on the ground (right)

A chemical garden while growing

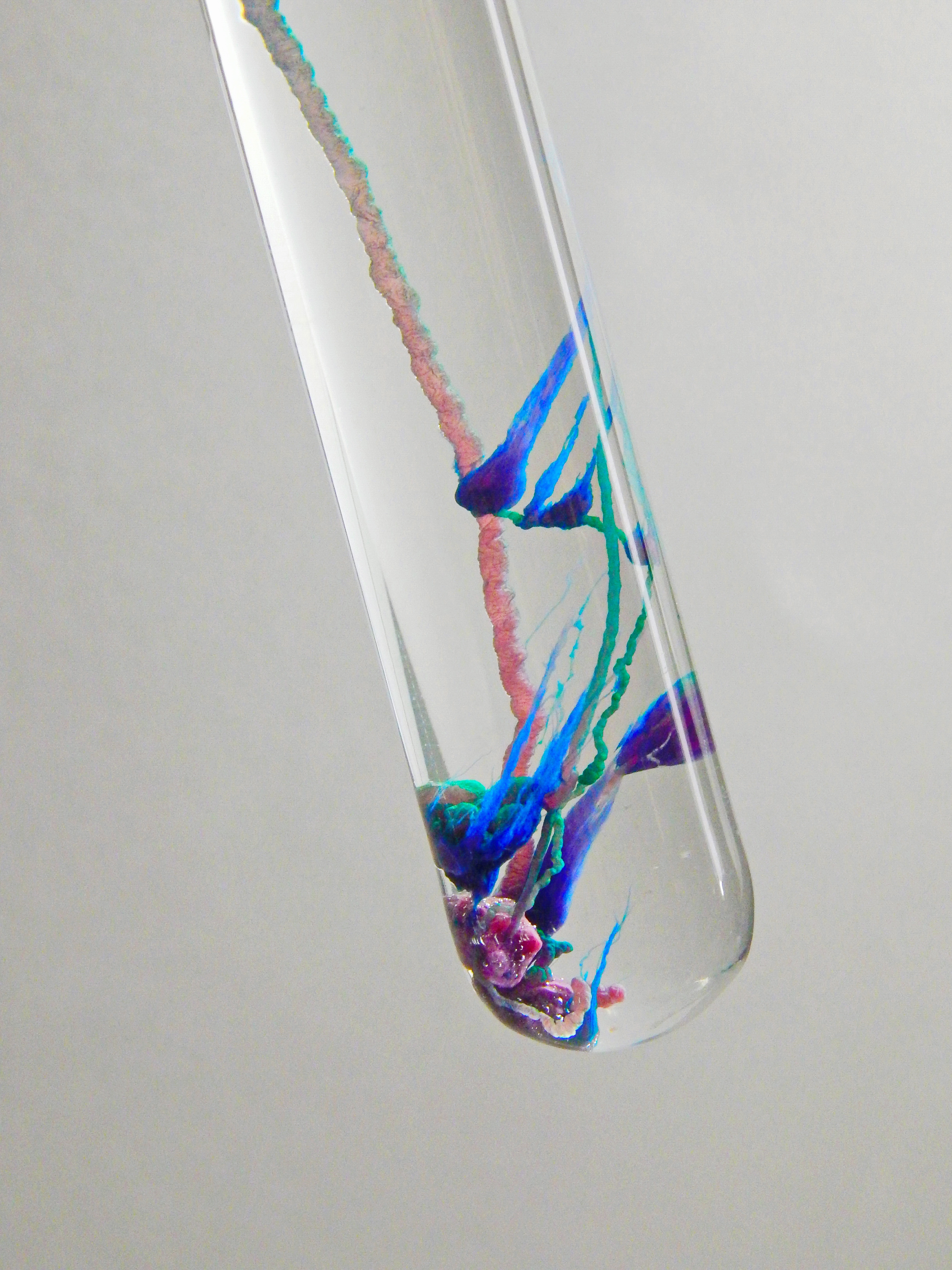
Cobalt(II) chloride

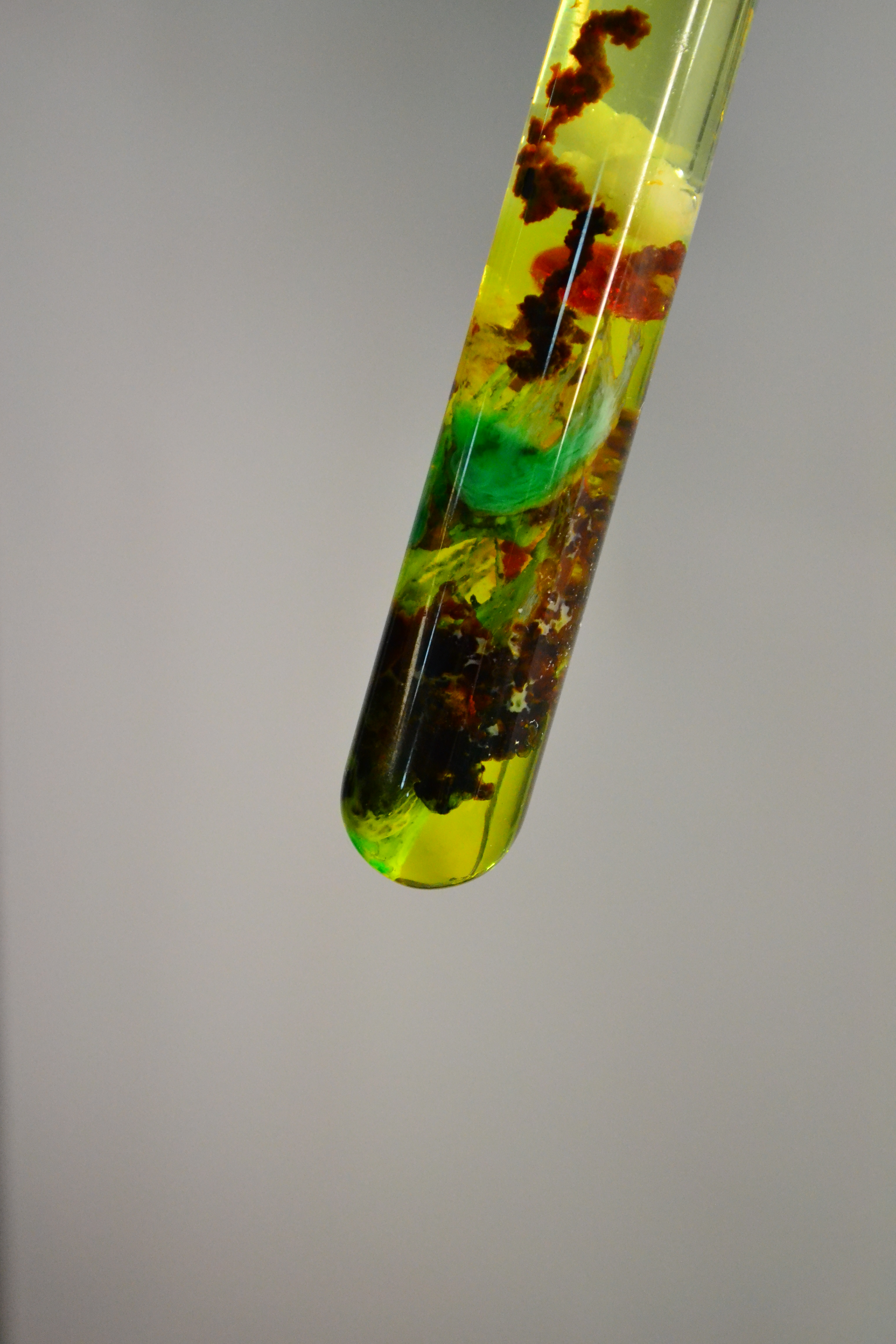
A chemical garden

A chemical garden is a set of complex biological-looking structures formed by mixing inorganic chemicals. This experiment in chemistry is usually performed by adding metal salts, such as copper sulfate or cobalt(II) chloride, to an aqueous solution of sodium silicate (otherwise known as waterglass).This results in the growth of colorful, long, tubular, plant-like structures that form within minutes to hours. In addition to these, organic chemical gardens have also been demonstrated.

The chemical garden was first observed and described by Johann Rudolf Glauber in the 17th century i.e., in 1646. In its original form, the chemical garden involved the introduction of ferrous chloride (FeCl_{2}) crystals into a solution of potassium silicate (K_{2}SiO_{3}). However, they were not studied in detail until the 2000s.

Chemical gardens have attracted increasing scientific interest because they can mimic geological and biological structures. Their nonequilibrium behaviour provides model systems for investigating self-organization and hypotheses about the emergence of life on earth and mars. Hydrothermal vent chimneys are regarded as natural analogues of chemical gardens and have been widely studied as models for studying origins of life.

Chemical gardens are named for their plant-like appearance and growth. The study of these structures and related self-organized systems is known as "chemobrionics", an emerging interdisciplinary field that integrates the concepts of physics, chemistry, materials science, biology and complex systems science to investigate reaction-diffusion-driven pattern formation. The term chemobrionics derives from "chemo" and the Greek word bruein ("to grow or enlarge"), referring to the osmotically driven growth of chemical gardens and related self-organized inorganic systems.

== Process ==
Chemical gardens rely on most transition-metal silicates being insoluble in water and colored. When a metal salt, such as cobalt chloride, is added to a sodium silicate solution, it will start to dissolve. It will then form insoluble cobalt silicate by a double displacement reaction. This cobalt silicate is a semipermeable membrane. Because the ionic strength of the cobalt solution inside the membrane is higher than that of the sodium silicate solution, which forms the bulk of the tank contents, osmotic effects will increase the pressure within the membrane. This will cause the membrane to rupture, forming a hole. The cobalt cations will react with the silicate anions at this opening to form a new solid. In this way, growths will form in the tanks; they will be colored (according to the metal cation) and may look like plant-like structures. The growth of chemical gardens is governed by the combined effect of osmotic pressure and buoyancy-driven convection. Osmotic pressure across the semipermeable membrane increases the internal pressure until the membrane ruptures, while buoyancy driven flow promotes the upward growth of the tubular structures.

The usual upward growth direction depends on the density of the fluid inside the semipermeable membrane of the "plant" being lower than that of the surrounding waterglass solution. If a metal salt produces a very dense fluid inside the membrane, growth is downward. For example, a green solution of trivalent chromium sulfate or chloride refuses to crystallize without slowly changing into the violet form, even if boiled until it concentrates into a tarry mass. When suspended in the waterglass solution, that tar forms downward twig-like growths. This is because all the fluid inside the membrane is too dense to float and thereby exerts a downward force. The concentration of sodium silicate becomes important in growth rate.

After the growth has ceased, the sodium silicate solution can be removed by a continuous addition of water at a very slow rate. This prolongs the life of the garden.

In one specific experimental variation, researchers produced the chemical garden with a single growth "tube".

In many modern chemical garden growth experiments, the solid reactant seed is replaced by the continuous injection of the corresponding reactant solution at a controlled flow rate, or more recently, under controlled osmotic pressure.

== Common salts used ==
Common salts used in a chemical garden include:

- Aluminium potassium sulfate: White
- Copper(II) sulfate: Blue
- Chromium(III) chloride: Green
- Nickel(II) sulfate: Green
- Iron(II) sulfate: Green
- Iron(III) chloride: Orange
- Cobalt(II) chloride: Purple
- Calcium chloride: White
- Zinc sulfate: White
- Manganese(II) chloride: Pink

== Experimental methods ==
Chemical gardens can be prepared using a variety of experimental techniques. In addition to the classical and versatile seed-growth method, scientists have developed growth in gels, injection techniques, membrane-based systems, quasi-two-dimensional Hele–Shaw cells, experiments under magnetic fields, and microgravity conditions, experiments under different gravitational fields have shown that gravity influences the growth pattern of chemical gardens, with upward growth becoming dominant above approximately 10^{−5} m s^{−2} when fluctuations are negligible, growth under an environmental scanning electron microscope, growth in gaseous acidic atmospheres to investigate the mechanisms of self-organized mineral growth.

== Practical uses ==
While at first the chemical garden may appear to be primarily a toy, some serious work has been done on the subject. For instance, this chemistry is related to the setting of Portland cement, the formation of hydrothermal vents, and the corrosion of steel surfaces on which insoluble tubes can be formed.

The nature of the growth of the insoluble silicate tubes formed within chemical gardens is also useful in understanding classes of related behavior seen in fluids separated by membranes. In various ways, the growth of the silicate tubes resembles the growth of spikes or blobs of ice extruded above the freezing surface of still water, the patterns formed by drying gum as it drips from wounds in trees such as Eucalyptus, and the way molten wax forms twig-like growths, either dripping from a candle, or floating up through cool water. The fundamental principles governing their self-assembly and membrane dynamics have been extensively leveraged across multiple scientific disciplines, including biomedicine (e.g., engineering cellular scaffolds and bone substitute materials), and astrobiology (e.g., modeling prebiotic compartmentalization and the emergence of life in hydrothermal vent environments).

Chemobrionic materials have also been investigated as active layers in memristive devices for neuromorphic computing. Copper silicate based chemical gardens have been shown to exhibit resistive switching behavior and synaptic functions, including paired-pulse facilitation and potentiation/depression, while operating with low energy consumption using solution-based fabrication methods. That broadens the applications potential of non-equilibrium structures.

== Paleontology ==
If the conditions are good, chemical gardens can also occur in nature. There is evidence from paleontology that such chemical gardens may fossilize. Such pseudofossils can be very difficult to distinguish from fossilized organisms. Indeed, some of the earliest purported fossils of life might be fossilized chemical gardens.

Mixing iron-rich particles with alkaline liquids containing the chemicals silicate or carbonate have created biological-looking structures. Such structures may appear to be biological structures and/or fossils. According to researchers, "Chemical reactions like these have been studied for hundreds of years but they had not previously been shown to mimic these tiny iron-rich structures inside rocks. These results call for a re-examination of many ancient real-world examples to see if they are more likely to be fossils or non-biological mineral deposits."

One use of the study of chemical gardening is to be better able to distinguish biological structures, including fossils, from non-biological structures on the planet Mars.

== See also ==
- Mercury beating heart
- Barking dog reaction
