= Brusselator =

Theoretical model for a type of autocatalytic reaction

Top: The Brusselator in the unstable regime (A=1, B=3): The system approaches a limit cycle Bottom: The Brusselator in a stable regime with A=1 and B=1.7: For B<1+A^{2} the system is stable and approaches a fixed point.

Simulation of the Brusselator as reaction diffusion system in two spatial dimensions

Simulation of the reaction-diffusion system of the Brusselator with reflective border conditions

The Brusselator is a theoretical model for a type of autocatalytic reaction. The Brusselator model was proposed by Ilya Prigogine and his collaborators at the Université Libre de Bruxelles.

It is a portmanteau of Brussels and oscillator.

It is characterized by the reactions

$$A \rightarrow X$$

$$2X + Y \rightarrow 3X$$

$$B + X \rightarrow Y + D$$

$$X \rightarrow E$$

Under conditions where A and B are in vast excess and can thus be modeled at constant concentration, the rate equations become

$${d \over dt}\left[ X \right] = \left[A \right] + \left[ X \right]^2 \left[Y \right]  - \left[B \right] \left[X \right] - \left[X \right]  \,$$

$${d \over dt}\left[ Y \right] =   \left[B \right] \left[X \right] - \left[ X \right]^2 \left[Y \right]    \,$$

where, for convenience, the rate constants have been set to 1.

The Brusselator has a fixed point at

$$\left[ X \right] =   \left[ A \right]    \,$$

$$\left[ Y \right] =   {\left[ B \right] \over \left[ A \right]}    \,$$.

The fixed point becomes unstable when

$$\left[ B \right]>1+\left[ A \right]^2   \,$$

leading to an oscillation of the system. Unlike the Lotka–Volterra equation, the oscillations of the Brusselator do not depend on the amount of reactant present initially. Instead, after sufficient time, the oscillations approach a limit cycle.

The best-known example is a chemical clock, such as the Belousov–Zhabotinsky reaction (BZ reaction). It can be created with a mixture of potassium bromate (KBrO_{3}), malonic acid (CH_{2}(COOH)_{2}), and manganese sulfate (MnSO_{4}) prepared in a heated solution of sulfuric acid (H_{2}SO_{4}).

== See also ==
- Lotka–Volterra equation
- Oregonator
