= Old Nassau reaction =

The Old Nassau reaction or Halloween reaction is a chemical clock reaction in which a clear solution turns orange and then black. This reaction was discovered by two undergraduate students at Princeton University researching the inhibition of the iodine clock reaction (or Landolt reaction) by Hg^{2+}, resulting in the formation of orange HgI_{2}. Orange and black are the school colors of Princeton University, and "Old Nassau" is a nickname for Princeton, named for its historic administration building, Nassau Hall.

== Chemical equation ==
The reactions involved are as follows:

1. Na_{2}S_{2}O_{5} + H_{2}O → 2 NaHSO_{3}
2. IO_{3}^{−} + 3 HSO_{3}^{−} → I^{−} + 3 SO_{4}^{2−} + 3 H^{+}
  This reaction reduces iodate ions to iodide ions.
3. Hg^{2+} + 2 I^{−} → HgI_{2}
  Orange mercury iodide solid is precipitated until the mercury is used up.
4. IO_{3}^{−} + 5 I^{−} + 6 H^{+} → 3 I_{2} + 3 H_{2}O
  The excess I^{−} and IO_{3}^{−} undergo the iodide-iodate reaction
5. I_{2} + starch → a blue/black complex
  A blue/black starch-iodine complex is formed.

== See also ==
- Iodine clock reaction
