= Noise-induced order =

Mathematical phenomenon

Noise-induced order is a mathematical phenomenon appearing in the Matsumoto-Tsuda model of the Belosov-Zhabotinski reaction.

In this model, adding noise to the system causes a transition from a "chaotic" behaviour to a more "ordered" behaviour; this article was a seminal paper in the area and generated a big number of citations and gave birth to a line of research in applied mathematics and physics. This phenomenon was later observed in the Belosov-Zhabotinsky reaction.

== Mathematical background ==
Interpolating experimental data from the Belosouv-Zabotinsky reaction, Matsumoto and Tsuda introduced a one-dimensional model, a random dynamical system with uniform additive noise, driven by the map:

$$T(x)=\begin{cases}
(a+(x-\frac{1}{8})^{\frac{1}{3}})e^{-x}+b, & 0\leq x\leq 0.3 \\
c(10xe^{\frac{-10x}{3}})^{19}+b & 0.3\leq x\leq 1
\end{cases}$$

where

- $a=\frac{19}{42}\cdot\bigg(\frac{7}{5}\bigg)^{1/3}$ (defined so that $T'(0.3^-)=0$),
- $b=0.02328852830307032054478158044023918735669943648088852646123182739831022528_{158}^{213}$, such that $T^5 (0.3)$ lands on a repelling fixed point (in some way this is analogous to a Misiurewicz point)
- $c=\frac{20}{3^{20}\cdot 7}\cdot\bigg(\frac{7}{5}\bigg)^{1/3}\cdot e^{187/10}$ (defined so that $T(0.3^-)=T(0.3^+)$).

This random dynamical system is simulated with different noise amplitudes using floating-point arithmetic and the Lyapunov exponent along the simulated orbits is computed; the Lyapunov exponent of this simulated system was found to transition from positive to negative as the noise amplitude grows.

The behavior of the floating point system and of the original system may differ; therefore, this is not a rigorous mathematical proof of the phenomenon.

A computer assisted proof of noise-induced order for the Matsumoto-Tsuda map with the parameters above was given in 2017. In 2020 a sufficient condition for noise-induced order was given for one dimensional maps: the Lyapunov exponent for small noise sizes is positive, while the average of the logarithm of the derivative with respect to Lebesgue is negative.

== See also ==
- Self-organization
- Stochastic Resonance
