= Alexander Manu =

Alexander Manu (born February 1, 1954, in Bucharest, Romania) is a strategic innovation consultant, lecturer and author particularly on the subject of innovation. He currently teaches at OCAD University and is a visiting lecturer at the Walace McCain Institute of Entrepreneurship. Between 2007-2019 Alexander was an adjunct professor at Rotman School of Management at the University of Toronto, where he introduced Innovation, Foresight and Business Design in the MBA curricula.

== Early life and education ==
In 1978 Manu graduated from the Institute of Fine Arts of Bucharest, Romania.

== Publications ==
- Transforming Organizations for the Subscription Economy, Routledge Publishing 2017 ISBN 1138281697
- VALUE CREATION AND THE INTERNET OF THINGS. How the Behaviour Economy will Shape the 4th Industrial Revolution Gower Publishing. 2015, 248 pages, Hardback. ISBN 978-1-4724-5181-1.
- BEHAVIOUR SPACE: Play, Pleasure and Discovery as a Model for Business Value. (Gower Publishing, 2012 UK. 210 pages, Hardback. ISBN 978-1-4094-4684-2.
- Disruptive Business: Desire, Innovation and the Re-Design of Business (Gower, 2010; ISBN 0-321-61846-7)
- Everything 2.0 (2008; ISBN 0-321-61846-7 )
- The Imagination Challenge: Strategic Foresight and Innovation in the Global Economy (Peachpit Press, 2006; ISBN 978-0-566-09240-4)
- The Big Idea of Design (1999)
- ToolToys: Tools with an Element of Play (1995)
