= Boris Belousov (chemist) =

Soviet scientist (1893–1970)

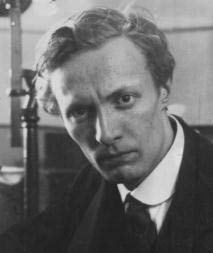
- Boris Pavlovich Belousov in the 1930s
- Born: Boris Pavlovich Belousov; 19 February 1893; Moscow, Russian Empire
- Died: 12 June 1970 (aged 77); Moscow, Russian SFSR, Soviet Union
- Awards: Lenin Prize, 1980 (posthumous)
- Scientific career
- Fields: Toxicology, oscillating chemical reactions
- Institutions: Zürich, Military laboratory of the USSR, Ministry of Health of the USSR

Boris Pavlovich Belousov (Russian: Бори́с Па́влович Белоу́сов; 19 February 1893 – 12 June 1970) was a Soviet chemist and biophysicist who discovered the Belousov–Zhabotinsky reaction (BZ reaction) in the early 1950s. His work initiated the field of modern nonlinear chemical dynamics.

The Belousov family had strong anti-Tsarist sympathies and, after the Russian Revolution of 1905, they were arrested and later forced to leave the country. They settled in Switzerland, where Boris studied chemistry in Zürich.

Returning to Russia at the beginning of World War I, Belousov tried to join the army, but was denied for health reasons. He took up a job in a military lab under the direction of the chemist Vladimir Ipatiev. His value to the institute is indicated by the high military rank, Brigade Commander, roughly corresponding to General, that he attained.

After leaving the military, he took a job in the Laboratory of Biophysics in the Ministry of Health of the USSR, where he worked in toxicology. It was while seeking an inorganic analog of the biochemical citric acid cycle that Belousov chanced to discover an oscillating chemical reaction. He tried twice over a period of six years to publish his findings, but the incredulous editors of the journals to which he submitted his articles rejected his work as "impossible". He took this very hard.

The biochemist Simon El'evich Shnoll, at the Institute for Theoretical and Experimental Biophysics in Pushchino, heard of Belousov's work and tried to encourage him to continue. Belousov gave Shnoll some of his experimental notes and agreed to publish an article in a rather obscure, non-reviewed, journal, but then essentially quit science. Shnoll gave the project to a graduate student, Anatol Zhabotinsky, who investigated the reaction in detail and succeeded in publishing his results. The reaction now bears the names of both Belousov and Zhabotinsky.

Belousov was posthumously awarded the Lenin Prize in 1980 for his work on the BZ reaction.
