= Belousov–Zhabotinsky reaction =

Non-equilibrium thermodynamic reaction

Computer simulation of the Belousov–Zhabotinsky reaction

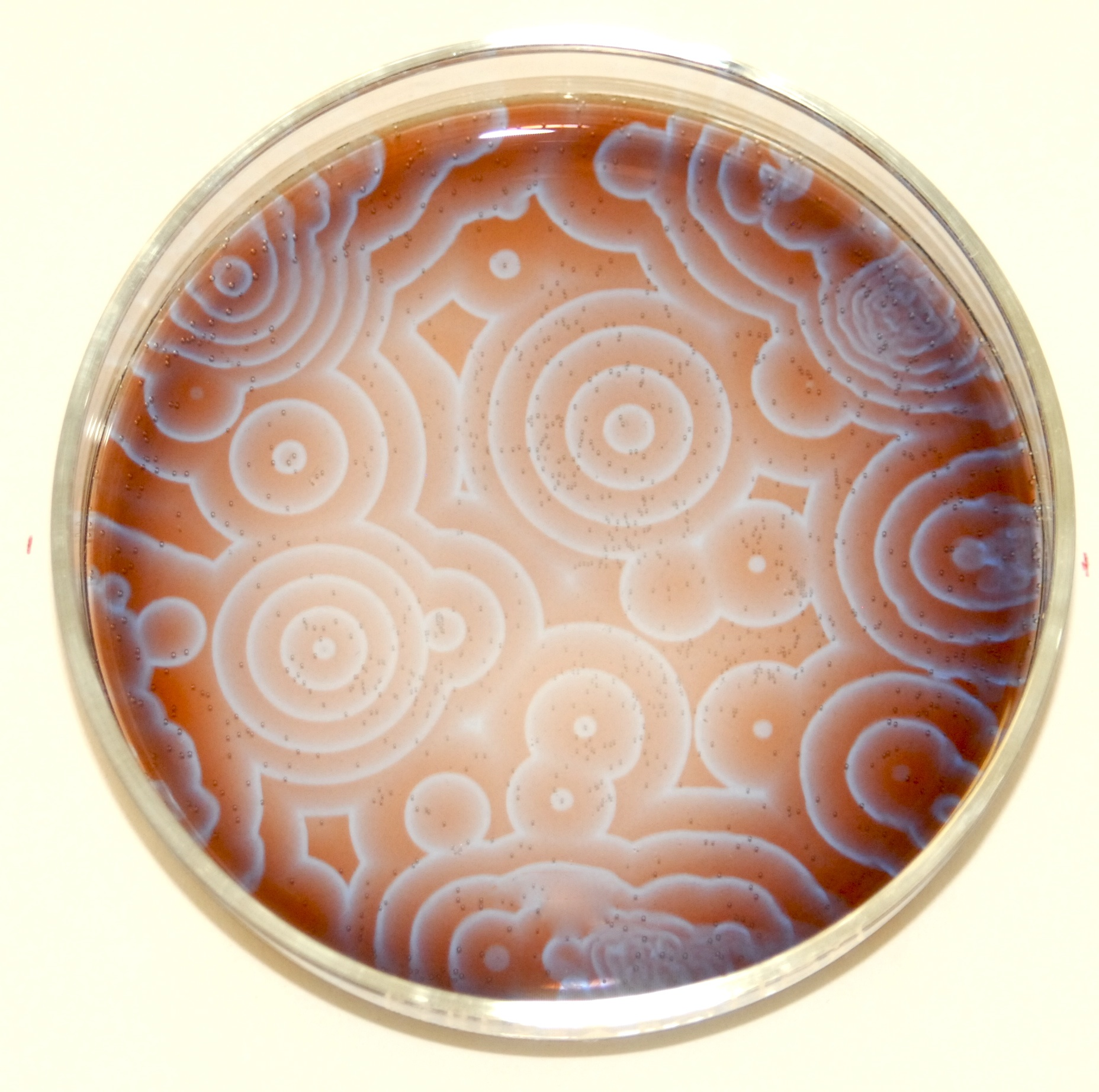
Patterns shown in a Petri dish

A Belousov–Zhabotinsky reaction, or BZ reaction, is one of a class of reactions that serve as a classical example of non-equilibrium thermodynamics, resulting in the establishment of a nonlinear chemical oscillator. The only common element in these oscillators is the inclusion of bromine and an acid. The reactions are important to theoretical chemistry in that they show that chemical reactions do not have to be dominated by equilibrium thermodynamic behavior. These reactions are far from equilibrium and remain so for a significant length of time and evolve chaotically. In this sense, they provide an interesting chemical model of nonequilibrium biological phenomena; as such, mathematical models and simulations of the BZ reactions themselves are of theoretical interest, showing phenomenon as noise-induced order.

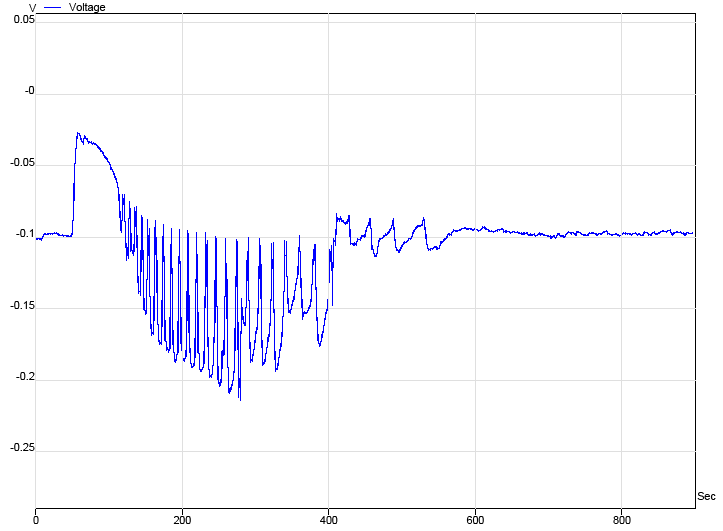
Plot of the electrode potential of a BZ reaction, using silver electrodes against an Ag/AgNO_{3} half-cell

An essential aspect of the BZ reaction is its so called "excitability"; under the influence of stimuli, patterns develop in what would otherwise be a perfectly quiescent medium. Some clock reactions such as Briggs–Rauscher and BZ using tris(bipyridine)ruthenium(II) chloride as a catalyst can be excited into self-organising activity through the influence of light.

== History ==
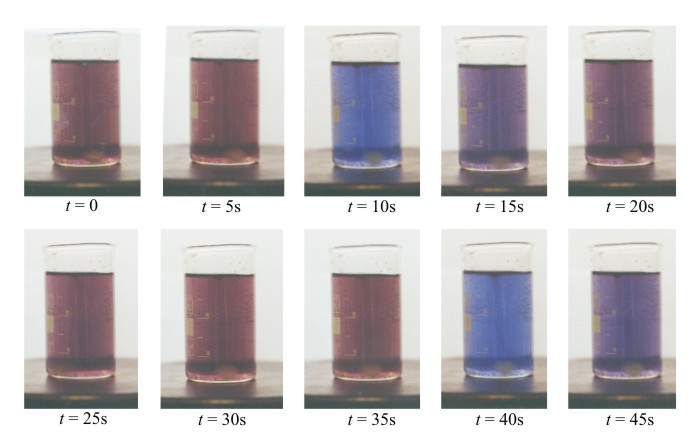
A stirred BZ reaction mixture showing changes in color over time

The discovery of the phenomenon is credited to Boris Belousov. In 1951, while trying to find the non-organic analog to the Krebs cycle, he noted that in a mix of potassium bromate, cerium(IV) sulfate, malonic acid, and citric acid in dilute sulfuric acid, the ratio of concentration of the cerium(IV) and cerium(III) ions oscillated, causing the colour of the solution to oscillate between a yellow solution and a colorless solution. This is due to the cerium(IV) ions being reduced by malonic acid to cerium(III) ions, which are then oxidized back to cerium(IV) ions by bromate(V) ions.

Belousov made two attempts to publish his finding, but was rejected on the grounds that he could not explain his results to the satisfaction of the editors of the journals to which he submitted his results. Soviet biochemist Simon El'evich Shnoll encouraged Belousov to continue his efforts to publish his results. In 1959 his work was finally published in a less respectable, nonreviewed journal.

After Belousov's publication, Shnoll gave the project in 1961 to a graduate student, Anatol Zhabotinsky, who investigated the reaction sequence in detail; however, the results of these men's work were still not widely disseminated, and were not known in the West until a conference in Prague in 1968.

A number of BZ cocktails are available in the chemical literature and on the web. Ferroin, a complex of phenanthroline and iron, is a common indicator. These reactions, if carried out in petri dishes, result in the formation first of colored spots. These spots grow into a series of expanding concentric rings or perhaps expanding spirals similar to the patterns generated by a cyclic cellular automaton. The colors disappear if the dishes are shaken, and then reappear. The waves continue until the reagents are consumed. The reaction can also be performed in a beaker using a magnetic stirrer.

Andrew Adamatzky, a computer scientist in the University of the West of England, reported on liquid logic gates using the BZ reaction. The BZ reaction has also been used by Juan Pérez-Mercader and his group at Harvard University to create an entirely chemical Turing machine, capable of recognizing a Chomsky type-1 language.

Strikingly similar oscillatory spiral patterns appear elsewhere in nature, at very different spatial and temporal scales, for example the growth pattern of Dictyostelium discoideum, a soil-dwelling amoeba colony. In the BZ reaction, the size of the interacting elements is molecular and the time scale of the reaction is minutes. In the case of the soil amoeba, the size of the elements is typical of single-celled organisms and the times involved are on the order of days to years.

Investigators are also exploring the creation of a "wet computer", using self-creating "cells" and other techniques to mimic certain properties of neurons.

In 2008, a high school students at Ibaraki Prefectural Mito Daini High School in Japan, who were conducting an experiment as part of their club activities, reported that when they left the reagents uncleaned after the reaction had stopped at the red color (which had previously been considered the end of the reaction), the solution turned yellow. This reaction, depending on the conditions, will resume if left for 5 to 20 hours after it has stopped at the final red color. This discovery was compiled as "Rebirth of a dead Belousov-Zhabotinsky oscillator" and published in a specialist journal.

== Chemical mechanism ==
The mechanism for this reaction is very complex and is thought to involve around 18 different steps which have been the subject of a number of research papers.

In a way similar to the Briggs–Rauscher reaction, two key processes (both of which are auto-catalytic) occur; process A generates molecular bromine, giving the red colour, and process B consumes the bromine to give bromide ions. Theoretically, the reaction resembles the ideal Turing pattern, a system that emerges qualitatively from solving the reaction diffusion equations for a reaction that generates both a reaction inhibitor and a reaction promoter, of which the two diffuse across the medium at different rates.

One of the most common variations on this reaction uses malonic acid (CH_{2}(CO_{2}H)_{2}) as the acid and potassium bromate (KBrO_{3}) as the source of bromine. The overall equation is:

3 CH_{2}(CO_{2}H)_{2} + 4 BrO_{3}^{−} → 4 Br^{−} + 9 CO_{2} + 6 H_{2}O

=== Variants ===
Many variants of the reaction exist. The only key chemical is the bromate oxidizer. The catalyst ion is most often cerium, but it can be also manganese, or complexes of iron, ruthenium, cobalt, copper, chromium, silver, nickel and osmium. Many different reductants can be used. (Zhabotinsky, 1964b; Field and Burger, 1985)

Many different patterns can be observed when the reaction is run in a microemulsion.

== See also ==
- Autowave
- Autowave reverberator
- Briggs–Rauscher reaction
- Dissipation
- Excitable medium
- Noise-induced order
- Patterns in nature
- Reaction–diffusion
- Self-oscillation
- Self-organization
- Stochastic resonance
- Alan Turing who mathematically predicted oscillating chemical reactions in the early 1950s
- Brusselator
- Oregonator
