= Chemical clock =

Chemical reaction after a predictable time

In an iodine clock reaction, colour changes after a time delay.

A chemical clock (or clock reaction) is a complex mixture of reacting chemical compounds in which the onset of an observable property (discoloration or coloration) occurs after a predictable induction time due to the presence of clock species at a detectable amount. In cases where one of the reagents has a visible color, crossing a concentration threshold can lead to an abrupt color change after a reproducible time lapse.

== Types ==
Clock reactions may be classified into three or four types:

=== Substrate-depletive clock reaction ===
The simplest clock reaction featuring two reactions:

A → C (rate k_{1})
B + C → products (rate k_{2}, fast)

When substrate (B) is present, the clock species (C) is quickly consumed in the second reaction. Only when substrate B is all used up or depleted, species C can build up in amount causing the color to change. The classical example for this clock reaction is the sulfite/iodate reaction or iodine clock reaction, also known as Landolt's reaction. A more modern example is the molybdenum blue clock reaction.

Sometimes, a clock reaction involves the production of intermediate species in three consecutive reactions.

P + Q → R
R + Q → C
P + C → 2R

Given that Q is in excess, when substrate (P) is depleted, C builds up resulting in the change in color.

=== Autocatalysis-driven clock reaction ===
The basis of the reaction is similar to substrate-depletive clock reaction, except for the fact that rate k_{2} is very slow leading to the co-existing of substrates and clock species, so there is no need for substrate to be depleted to observe the change in color. The example for this clock is pentathionate/iodate reaction.

=== Pseudoclock behavior ===
The reactions in this category behave like a clock reaction, however they are irreproducible, unpredictable and hard to control. Examples are chlorite/thiosulfate and iodide/chlorite reactions.

=== Crazy clock reaction ===
The reaction is irreproducible in each run due to the initial inhomogeneity of the mixture which result from variation in stirring rate, overall volume as well as geometry of the reactors. Repeating the reaction in the statistically meaningful manners leads to the reproducible cumulative probability distribution curve. The example for this clock is iodate/arsenous acid reaction.

One reaction may fall into more than one classification above depending on the circumstance. For example, iodate−arsenous acid reaction can be substrate-depletive clock reaction, autocatalysis-driven clock reaction and crazy clock reaction.

== Examples ==
One class of example is the iodine clock reactions, in which an iodine species is mixed with redox reagents in the presence of starch. After a delay, a dark blue color suddenly appears due to the formation of a triiodide-starch complex.

The cinnamaldehyde clock reaction is an organic clock reaction, in which acetone is added to a basic solution containing trans-cinnamaldehyde and acetone. A precipitate of dicinnamalacetone appears suddenly after a delay.

Additional reagents can be added to some chemical clocks to build a chemical oscillator. For example, the Briggs–Rauscher reaction is derived from an iodine clock reaction by adding perchloric acid, malonic acid and manganese sulfate.

== See also ==
- Circadian clock
- Chemical oscillator
