= Barking dog reaction =

Combustion reaction known for the sound it makes

Video of a barking dog reaction by Maxim Bilovitskiy

The "Barking Dog" is an exothermic chemical reaction that results from the ignition of a mixture of carbon disulfide and nitrous oxide. When ignited in a cylindrical tube, the reaction produces a bright flash and a loud "woof" - reminiscent of a barking dog.

In simple terms, the 'Barking Dog' reaction is a combustion process, in which a fuel (carbon disulfide, CS_{2}) reacts with an oxidizing agent (nitrous oxide, N_{2}O), producing heat and elemental sulfur. The flame front in the reaction is a zone of very hot, luminous gas, produced by the reactants decomposing.

8 N_{2}O + 4 CS_{2} → S_{8} + 4 CO_{2} + 8 N_{2}

In April 1853, Justus von Liebig performed the demonstration in front of the Bavarian royal family; however, the glass container shattered, and shards of glass inflicted minor injuries on the faces of Queen Therese, her son Prince Luitpold, and Liebig himself.
