= Iodate =

Polyatomic anion (IO3) with charge -1

- The iodate anion, IO^{−}_{3}

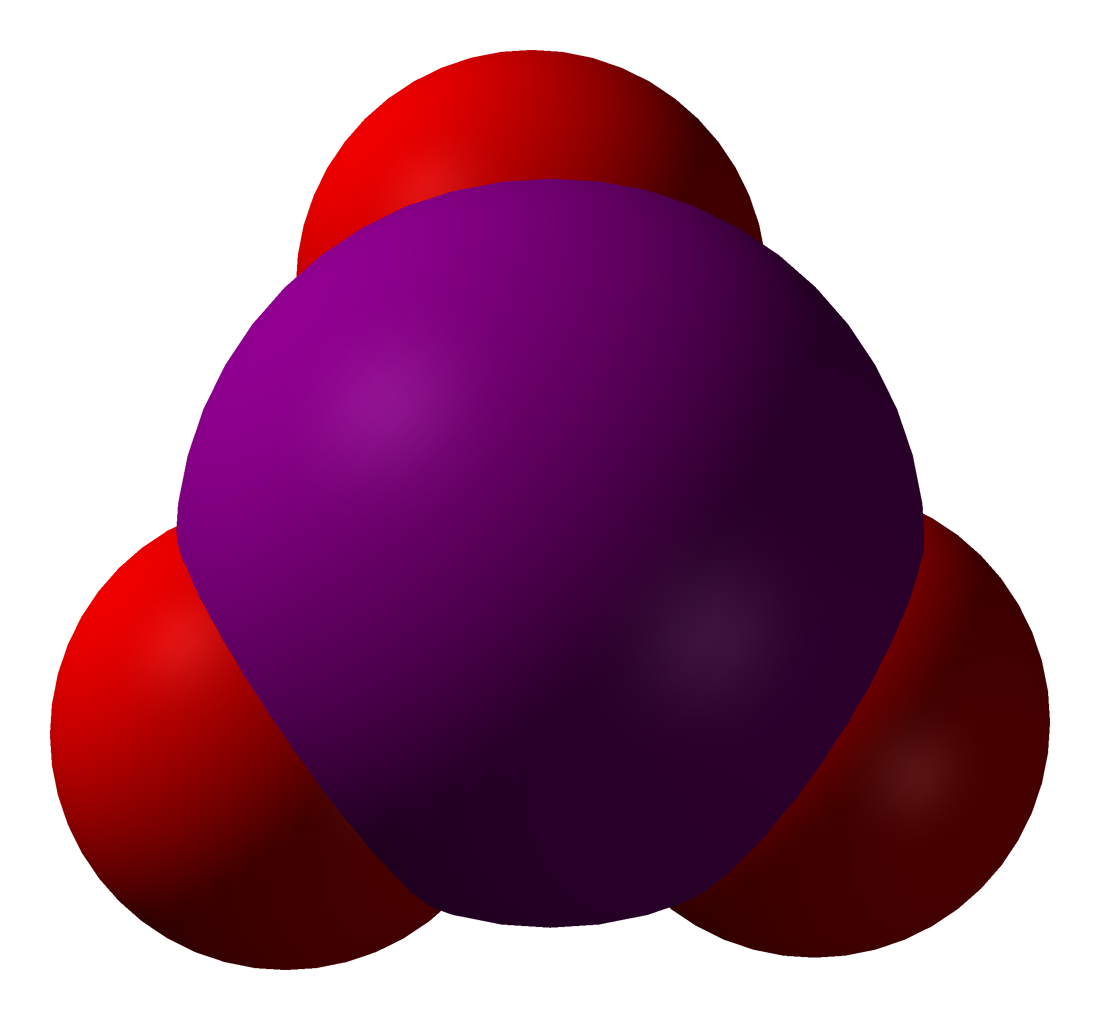
- Space-filling model of the iodate anion

Identifiers
| CAS Number | 15454-31-6 |
| 3D model (JSmol) | Interactive image |
| ChEBI | CHEBI:29226; CHEBI:24856 (class of salts) |
| ChemSpider | 76615 |
| Gmelin Reference | 1676 |
| PubChem CID | 84927 |
| UNII | 877S7T6EXV |
- InChI: InChI=1S/HIO3/c2-1(3)4/h(H,2,3,4)/p-1 Key: ICIWUVCWSCSTAQ-UHFFFAOYSA-M
- SMILES: [O-]I(=O)=O

Properties
| Chemical formula | IO_{3}^{−} |
| Molar mass | 174.902 g·mol^{−1} |

Related compounds
| Related compounds | Periodate, Fluoroiodate, Bromate, Chlorate |
- Except where otherwise noted, data are given for materials in their standard state (at 25 °C [77 °F], 100 kPa). Infobox references

An iodate is the polyatomic anion with the formula IO^{−}_{3}. It is the most common form of iodine in nature, as it comprises the major iodine-containing ores. Iodate salts are often colorless. They are the salts of iodic acid.

== Structure ==
Iodate is pyramidal in structure. The O–I–O angles range from 97° to 105°, somewhat smaller than the O–Cl–O angles in chlorate.

== Reactions ==
=== Redox ===
Iodate is one of several oxyanions of iodine, and has an oxidation number of +5. It participates in several redox reactions, such as the iodine clock reaction. Iodate shows no tendency to disproportionate to periodate and iodide, in contrast to the situation for chlorate.

Iodate is reduced by sulfite:

6HSO^{−}_{3} + 2IO^{−}_{3} → 2I^{−} + 6HSO^{−}_{4}

Iodate oxidizes iodide in acidic conditions:

5I^{−} + IO^{−}_{3} + 3H_{2}SO_{4} → 3I_{2} + 3H_{2}O + 3SO^{2−}_{4}

Similarly, chlorate oxidizes iodide to iodate:

I^{−} + ClO^{−}_{3} → Cl^{−} + IO^{−}_{3}

Iodate is also obtained by reducing a periodate with a sulfide. The byproduct of the reaction is a sulfoxide.

=== Acid-base ===
Iodate is unusual in that it forms a strong hydrogen bond with its parent acid:

IO^{−}_{3} + HIO_{3} → H(IO_{3})^{−}_{2}

The anion H(IO_{3})^{−}_{2} is referred to as biiodate. Biiodate compounds are often named with hydrogen diiodate.

== Principal compounds ==
- Calcium iodate, Ca(IO_{3})_{2}, is the principal ore of iodine. It is also used as a nutritional supplement for cattle.
- Potassium iodate, KIO_{3}, like potassium iodide, has been issued as a prophylaxis against radioiodine absorption in some countries. It is also one of the iodine compounds used to make iodized salt.
- Potassium hydrogen diiodate (also known as potassium biiodate), KH(IO_{3})_{2}, is a double salt of potassium iodate and iodic acid, and is an acid itself.
- When some oxygen is replaced by fluorine, fluoroiodates are produced.

== Natural occurrence ==
Minerals containing iodate are found in the caliche deposits of Chile. The most important iodate minerals are lautarite and brüggenite, but also copper-bearing iodates such as salesite are known.

Natural waters contain iodine in the form of iodide and iodate, their ratio being dependent on redox conditions and pH. Iodate is the second most abundant form in water. It is mostly associated with alkaline waters and oxidizing conditions.
