= Piskunov =

Piskunov (masculine, Russian: Пискунов) or Piskunova (feminine, Russian: Пискунова) is a Russian surname. Notable people with the surname include:

- Anatoli Piskunov (born 1949), Russian soccer player
- Anton Piskunov (born 1989), Russian soccer player
- Dmitri Piskunov (born 1969), Russian soccer coach and former player
- Hlib Piskunov (born 1998), Ukrainian hammer thrower
- Maxim Piskunov (born 1997), Russian cyclist
- Mikhail Piskunov (1967–2002), Russian rugby player
- Nikolai Piskunov (1908-1977), Russian mathematician
- Oleksandr Piskunov (born 1991), Ukrainian actor
- Sergei Piskunov (born 1981), Russian ice hockey player
- Sergey Piskunov (born 1989), Ukrainian painter
- Vladimir Piskunov (1941–2024), Soviet-Russian politician
- Vladyslav Piskunov (born 1978), Ukrainian hammer thrower
- Yelena Piskunova (born 1980), Uzbekistani sprinter

== See also ==
- 9056 Piskunov, a minor planet named after Nikolai Piskunov
