= Bacterial patterns =

Pattern formation of bacteria colony shapes

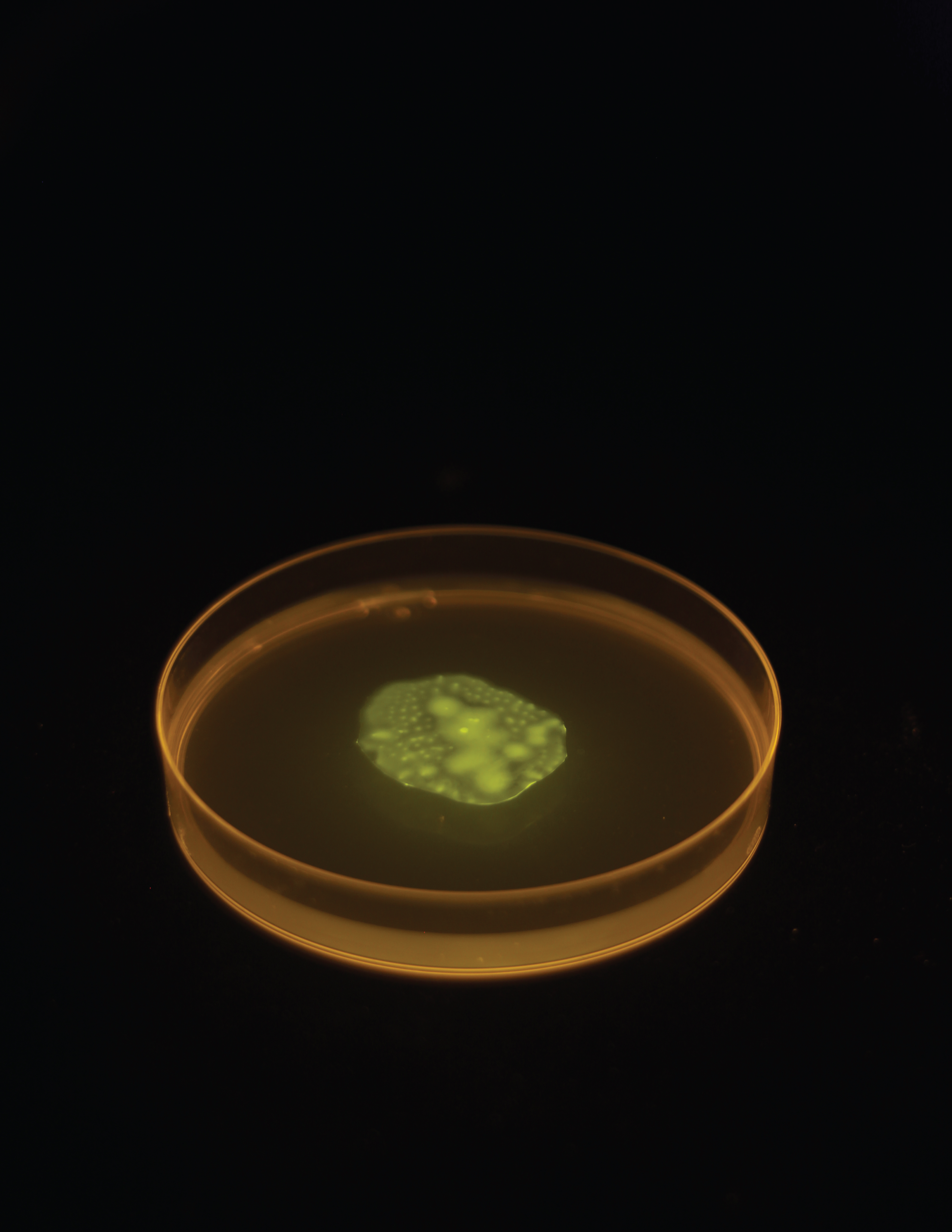
E. coli condensation and pattern formation under pH stress through negative chemotaxis.

Populations of bacteria may form macroscopic patterns often visible to the naked eye. Pattern formation may arise from mechanisms such as growth, motility, and chemical signaling between cells, and relies on positive feedback between several physical, chemical and biological variables.

During growth on solid surfaces, bacterial colonies may evolve different morphologies depending on growth conditions. Different patterns emerge as a result from feedback between nutrient consumption, waste secretion, substrate stiffness, and cellular growth. In liquid and porous media, bacteria may form dynamic patterns by swimming toward each other. By modulating their local chemical environment, cells communicate and attract others to form ordered patterns of millimetric condensates composed of swimming cells. This type of pattern formation relies on feedback between the ability of cells to migrate toward favorable conditions using their chemotaxis system, and the cell-mediated chemical changes to the environment.

Bacterial pattern formation has been observed and studied in many model organisms, such as Escherichia coli, Bacillus subtilis, Proteus mirabilis, and various Pseudomonas.

== Patterns in bacterial colonies ==
The formation of patterns in the growth of bacterial colonies has extensively been studied experimentally. A large number of studies on pattern formation in bacterial colonies have been performed in Bacillus subtilis and in Proteus mirabilis. Resulting morphologies appear to depend on the growth conditions. They include well known morphologies such as dense branched morphology (DBM) or diffusion-limited aggregation (DLA), but much complex patterns and temporal behaviour can be found.

Colonies of Bacillus subtilis on a Petri dish can grow under controlled conditions. By varying agar concentration (which permits the control of the hardness of the medium), and the nutrient concentration, the response of the colony to external stresses can be studied. The different morphologies appear in the following growth conditions:

- High nutrient levels, stiff medium: Eden-like growth
- High nutrients level, semi-soft hardness of medium - Periodical growth forming concentric rings
- High nutrients level, soft medium - homogeneous, disk-like growth
- Low nutrients level, stiff medium - DLA growth
- Low nutrients level, soft medium - DBM growth

A complete morphological diagram can then be drawn by varying growth conditions.

These different morphologies can be obtained from a reaction-diffusion model. This kind of model is useful to assess which mechanisms are relevant for the different morphologies. The complete morphological diagram can be obtained by using two fields, density of bacteria and nutrient concentration, and taking into account that bacteria can increase motility in response to adverse external conditions. That means that diffusion in the medium and the response of bacteria are the relevant factors in this particular case.

== Patterns of swimming bacteria ==
Motile bacteria can migrate along chemical gradients in a process termed chemotaxis. Under various conditions bacteria can also modulate their local environment. By doing so, they self-generate chemical gradients, and by following these gradients, self-attraction between neighboring cells emerges, leading to positive feedback and to the formation of macroscopic patterns. Such large scale condensation has been observed through secretion of attractant molecules and removal of repellent molecules, and appear to be beneficial for bacteria during stress.

Mathematical modeling of such pattern formation is often done by modifying the Keller-Segel equations. Typically, a set of non-linear partial differential equations are used to model the bacterial behavior and the chemical environment to which they respond (reaction-diffusion equations).
