= Pattern formation =

Study of how patterns form by self-organization in nature

Pattern formation in a computational model of dendrite growth.

The science of pattern formation deals with the visible, (statistically) orderly outcomes of self-organization and the common principles behind similar patterns in nature.

In developmental biology, pattern formation refers to the generation of complex organizations of cell fates in space and time. The role of genes in pattern formation is an aspect of morphogenesis, the creation of diverse anatomies from similar genes, now being explored in the science of evolutionary developmental biology or evo-devo. The mechanisms involved are well seen in the anterior-posterior patterning of embryos from the model organism Drosophila melanogaster (a fruit fly), one of the first organisms to have its morphogenesis studied, and in the eyespots of butterflies, whose development is a variant of the standard (fruit fly) mechanism.

== Patterns in nature ==
Examples of pattern formation can be found in biology, physics, and other scientific fields, and can readily be simulated with computer graphics, as described in turn below.

=== Biology ===
Biological patterns such as animal markings, the segmentation of animals, and phyllotaxis are formed in different ways. Phyllotaxis is the regular arrangement of leaves, flowers or seeds around a plant stem often forming spiral patterns found in many plants such as sunflowers, pinecones etc.

In developmental biology, pattern formation describes the mechanism by which initially equivalent cells in a developing tissue in an embryo assume complex forms and functions. Embryogenesis, such as of the fruit fly Drosophila, involves coordinated control of cell fates. Pattern formation is genetically controlled, and often involves each cell in a field sensing and responding to its position along a morphogen gradient, followed by short-distance cell-to-cell communication through cell-signaling pathways to refine the initial pattern. In this context, a field of cells is the group of cells whose fates are affected by responding to the same set of positional information cues. This conceptual model was first described as the French flag model in the 1960s. More generally, the morphology of organisms is patterned by the mechanisms of evolutionary developmental biology, such as changing the timing and positioning of specific developmental events in the embryo.

Possible mechanisms of pattern formation in biological systems include the classical reaction–diffusion model proposed by Alan Turing and the more-recently-found elastic instability mechanism which is thought to be responsible for the fold patterns on the cerebral cortex of higher animals, among other things. Cellular automata and neural network models have both been proposed to explain the patterns on some marine mollusc shells such as those of the genus Conus.

==== Growth of colonies ====
Bacterial colonies show a large variety of patterns formed during colony growth. The resulting shapes depend on the growth conditions. In particular, stresses (hardness of the culture medium, lack of nutrients, etc.) enhance the complexity of the resulting patterns. Other organisms such as slime moulds display remarkable patterns caused by the dynamics of chemical signaling. Cellular embodiment (elongation and adhesion) can also have an impact on the developing patterns.

==== Vegetation patterns ====
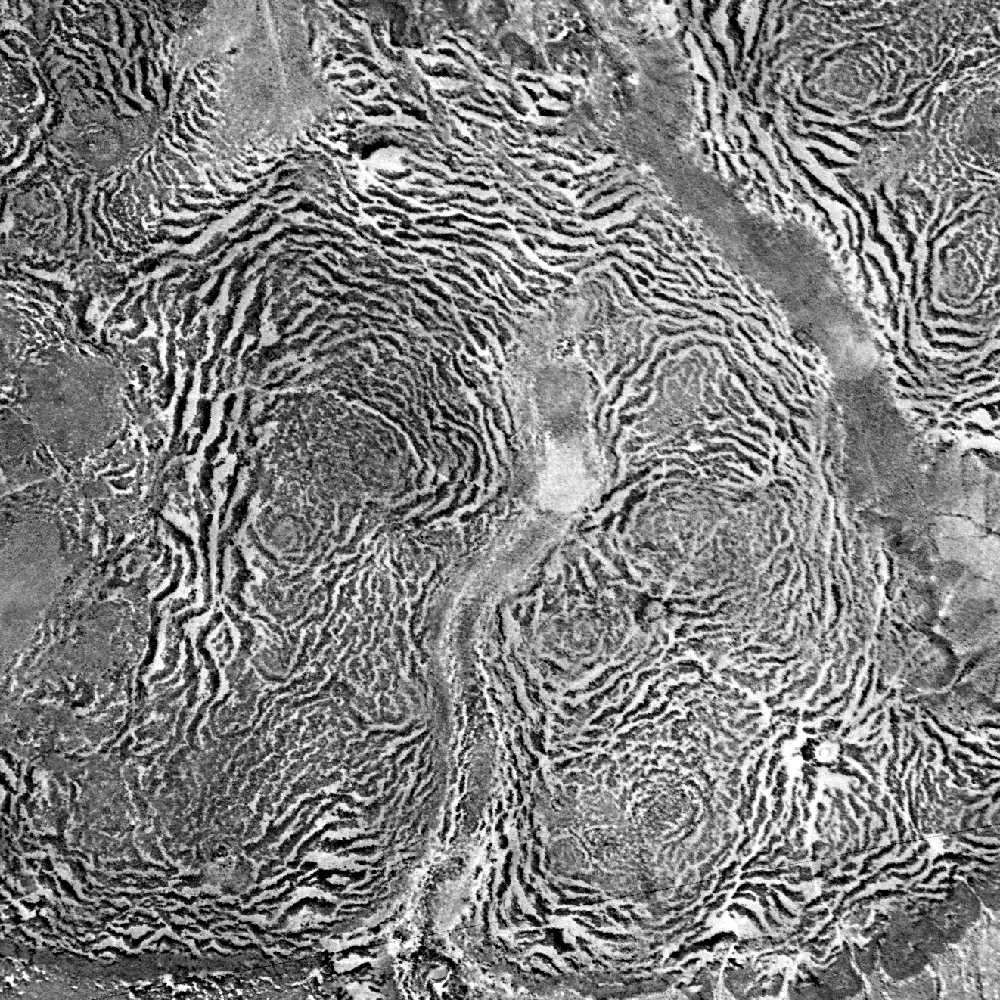
Tiger bush is a vegetation pattern that forms in arid conditions.

Vegetation patterns such as tiger bush and fir waves form for different reasons. Tiger bush consists of stripes of bushes on arid slopes in countries such as Niger where plant growth is limited by rainfall. Each roughly horizontal stripe of vegetation absorbs rainwater from the bare zone immediately above it. In contrast, fir waves occur in forests on mountain slopes after wind disturbance, during regeneration. When trees fall, the trees that they had sheltered become exposed and are in turn more likely to be damaged, so gaps tend to expand downwind. Meanwhile, on the windward side, young trees grow, protected by the wind shadow of the remaining tall trees. In flat terrains, additional pattern morphologies appear besides stripes – hexagonal gap patterns and hexagonal spot patterns. Pattern formation in this case is driven by positive feedback loops between local vegetation growth and water transport towards the growth location.

=== Chemistry ===
Pattern formation has been well-studied in chemistry and chemical engineering, including both temperature and concentration patterns. The Brusselator model developed by Ilya Prigogine and collaborators is one such example that exhibits Turing instability. Pattern formation in chemical systems often involves oscillatory chemical kinetics or autocatalytic reactions such as the Belousov–Zhabotinsky or Briggs–Rauscher reactions. In industrial applications such as chemical reactors, pattern formation can lead to temperature hot spots, which can reduce the yield or create hazardous safety problems such as a thermal runaway. The emergence of pattern formation can be studied by mathematical modeling and simulation of the underlying reaction-diffusion system.

Similarly as in chemical systems, patterns can develop in a weakly ionized plasma of a positive column of a glow discharge. In such cases, creation and annihilation of charged particles due to collisions of atoms corresponds to reactions in chemical systems. Corresponding processes are essentially non-linear and lead in a discharge tube to formation of striations with regular or random character.

Other chemical patterns include Liesegang rings.

=== Physics ===
When a planar body of fluid under the influence of gravity is heated from below, Rayleigh-Bénard convection can form organized cells in hexagons or other shapes. These patterns form on the surface of the Sun and in the mantle of the Earth as well as during more pedestrian processes. The interaction between rotation, gravity, and convection can cause planetary atmospheres to form patterns, as is seen in Saturn's hexagon and the Great Red Spot and stripes of Jupiter. The same processes cause ordered cloud formations on Earth, such as stripes and rolls.

In the 1980s, Lugiato and Lefever developed a model of light propagation in an optical cavity that results in pattern formation by the exploitation of nonlinear effects.

Precipitating and solidifying materials can crystallize into intricate patterns, such as those seen in snowflakes and dendritic crystals.

=== Mathematics ===
Sphere packings and coverings. Mathematics underlies the other pattern formation mechanisms listed.

=== Computer graphics ===
Pattern resembling a reaction–diffusion model, produced using sharpen and blur

Some types of automata have been used to generate organic-looking textures for more realistic shading of 3D objects.

A popular Photoshop plugin, KPT 6, included a filter called "KPT reaction". Reaction produced reaction–diffusion style patterns based on the supplied seed image.

A similar effect to the KPT reaction can be achieved with convolution functions in digital image processing, with a little patience, by repeatedly sharpening and blurring an image in a graphics editor. If other filters are used, such as emboss or edge detection, different types of effects can be achieved.

Computers are often used to simulate the biological, physical, or chemical processes that lead to pattern formation, and they can display the results in a realistic way. Calculations using models like reaction–diffusion or MClone are based on the actual mathematical equations designed by the scientists to model the studied phenomena.

== Bibliography ==
- Ball, Philip (2009). Nature's Patterns: a tapestry in three parts. 1:Shapes. 2:Flow. 3:Branches. Oxford. ISBN 978-0-19-960486-9.
