= Run-on (disambiguation) =

Run On or run-on may refer to:

- Run-on, in hydrology, the process or measure of surface water infiltration
- Run-on sentence, a grammatical construction
- Nuclear run-on, a test to identify genes
- Run On (band)
- "God's Gonna Cut You Down" (also known as "Run On" or "Run On for a Long Time"), a folk song covered by many artists
- Run On (TV series), a South Korean television series

== See also ==
- On the Run (disambiguation)
