= Periodic travelling wave =

Constant speed wavetrain

In mathematics, a periodic travelling wave (or wavetrain) is a periodic function of one-dimensional space that moves with constant speed. Consequently, it is a special type of spatiotemporal oscillation that is a periodic function of both space and time.

Periodic travelling waves play a fundamental role in many mathematical equations, including self-oscillatory systems, excitable systems and reaction–diffusion–advection systems. Equations of these types are widely used as mathematical models of biology, chemistry and physics, and many examples in phenomena resembling periodic travelling waves have been found empirically.

The mathematical theory of periodic travelling waves is most fully developed for partial differential equations, but these solutions also occur in a number of other types of mathematical system, including integrodifferential equations, integrodifference equations, coupled map lattices and cellular automata.

As well as being important in their own right, periodic travelling waves are significant as the one-dimensional equivalent of spiral waves and target patterns in two-dimensional space, and of scroll waves in three-dimensional space.

== History of research ==
While periodic travelling waves have been known as solutions of the wave equation since the 18th century, their study in nonlinear systems began in the 1970s. A key early research paper was that of Nancy Kopell and Lou Howard which proved several fundamental results on periodic travelling waves in reaction–diffusion equations. This was followed by significant research activity during the 1970s and early 1980s. There was then a period of inactivity, before interest in periodic travelling waves was renewed by mathematical work on their generation, and by their detection in ecology, in spatiotemporal data sets on cyclic populations. Since the mid-2000s, research on periodic travelling waves has benefitted from new computational methods for studying their stability and absolute stability.

== Families ==
The existence of periodic travelling waves usually depends on the parameter values in a mathematical equation. If there is a periodic travelling wave solution, then there is typically a family of such solutions, with different wave speeds. For partial differential equations, periodic travelling waves typically occur for a continuous range of wave speeds.

== Stability ==
An important question is whether a periodic travelling wave is stable or unstable as a solution of the original mathematical system. For partial differential equations, it is typical that the wave family subdivides into stable and unstable parts. For unstable periodic travelling waves, an important subsidiary question is whether they are absolutely or convectively unstable, meaning that there are or are not stationary growing linear modes. This issue has only been resolved for a few partial differential equations.

== Generation ==
A number of mechanisms of periodic travelling wave generation are now well established. These include:

- Heterogeneity: spatial noise in parameter values can generate a series of bands of periodic travelling waves. This is important in applications to oscillatory chemical reactions, where impurities can cause target patterns or spiral waves, which are two-dimensional generalisations of periodic travelling waves. This process provided the motivation for much of the work on periodic travelling waves in the 1970s and early 1980s. Landscape heterogeneity has also been proposed as a cause of the periodic travelling waves seen in ecology.
- Invasions, which can leave a periodic travelling wave in their wake. This is important in the Taylor–Couette system in the presence of through flow, in chemical systems such as the Belousov–Zhabotinsky reaction and in predator-prey systems in ecology.
- Waves generated by a Dirichlet boundary condition on a central hole
  Domain boundaries with Dirichlet or Robin boundary conditions. This is potentially important in ecology, where Robin or Dirichlet conditions correspond to a boundary between habitat and a surrounding hostile environment. However definitive empirical evidence on the cause of waves is hard to obtain for ecological systems.
- Migration driven by pursuit and evasion. This may be significant in ecology.
- Migration between sub-populations, which again has potential ecological significance.

In all of these cases, a key question is which member of the periodic travelling wave family is selected. For most mathematical systems this remains an open problem.

== Spatiotemporal chaos ==
Periodic travelling waves and chaos in simulated invasion of prey by predators

It is common that for some parameter values, the periodic travelling waves arising from a wave generation mechanism are unstable. In such cases the solution usually evolves to spatiotemporal chaos. Thus the solution involves a spatiotemporal transition to chaos via the periodic travelling wave.

== Lambda–omega systems and the complex Ginzburg–Landau equation ==
There are two particular mathematical systems that serve as prototypes for periodic travelling waves, and which have been fundamental to the development of mathematical understanding and theory. These are the "lambda-omega" class of reaction–diffusion equations
$$\frac{\partial u}{\partial t}=\frac{\partial^2 u}{\partial x^2}+\lambda(r)u-\omega(r)v$$
$$\frac{\partial v}{\partial t}=\frac{\partial^2 v}{\partial x^2}+\omega(r)u+\lambda(r)v$$

($r = \sqrt{u^2 + v^2}$) and the complex Ginzburg–Landau equation.

$$\frac{\partial A}{\partial t} = A + (1 + ib)\frac{\partial^2 A}{\partial x^2} - (1 + ic)|A|^2 A$$

(A is complex-valued). Note that these systems are the same if λ(r) = 1 − r^{2}, ω(r) = −c r^{2} and b = 0. Both systems can be simplified by rewriting the equations in terms of the amplitude (r or |A|) and the phase (arctan(v/u) or arg A). Once the equations have been rewritten in this way, it is easy to see that solutions with constant amplitude are periodic travelling waves, with the phase being a linear function of space and time. Therefore, u and v, or Re(A) and Im(A), are sinusoidal functions of space and time.

These exact solutions for the periodic travelling wave families enable a great deal of further analytical study. Exact conditions for the stability of the periodic travelling waves can be found, and the condition for absolute stability can be reduced to the solution of a simple polynomial. Also exact solutions have been obtained for the selection problem for waves generated by invasions and by zero Dirichlet boundary conditions. In the latter case, for the complex Ginzburg–Landau equation, the overall solution is a stationary Nozaki-Bekki hole.

Much of the work on periodic travelling waves in the complex Ginzburg–Landau equation is in the physics literature, where they are usually known as plane waves.

== Numerical computation of periodic travelling waves and their stability ==
For most mathematical equations, analytical calculation of periodic travelling wave solutions is not possible, and therefore it is necessary to perform numerical computations. For partial differential equations, denote by x and t the (one-dimensional) space and time variables, respectively. Then periodic travelling waves are functions of the travelling wave variable z=x-c t. Substituting this solution form into the partial differential equations gives a system of ordinary differential equations known as the travelling wave equations. Periodic travelling waves correspond to limit cycles of these equations, and this provides the basis for numerical computations. The standard computational approach is numerical continuation of the travelling wave equations. One first performs a continuation of a steady state to locate a Hopf bifurcation point. This is the starting point for a branch (family) of periodic travelling wave solutions, which one can follow by numerical continuation. In some (unusual) cases both end points of a branch (family) of periodic travelling wave solutions are homoclinic solutions, in which case one must use an external starting point, such as a numerical solution of the partial differential equations.

Periodic travelling wave stability can also be calculated numerically, by computing the spectrum. This is made easier by the fact that the spectrum of periodic travelling wave solutions of partial differential equations consists entirely of essential spectrum. Possible numerical approaches include Hill's method and numerical continuation of the spectrum. One advantage of the latter approach is that it can be extended to calculate boundaries in parameter space between stable and unstable waves

Software: The free, open-source software package Wavetrain http://www.ma.hw.ac.uk/wavetrain is designed for the numerical study of periodic travelling waves. Using numerical continuation, Wavetrain is able to calculate the form and stability of periodic travelling wave solutions of partial differential equations, and the regions of parameter space in which waves exist and in which they are stable.

== Applications ==
Examples of phenomena resembling periodic travelling waves that have been found empirically include the following.

- Many natural populations undergo multi-year cycles of abundance. In some cases these population cycles are spatially organised into a periodic travelling wave. This behaviour has been found in voles in Fennoscandia and Northern UK, geometrid moths in Northern Fennoscandia, larch budmoths in the European Alps and red grouse in Scotland.
- In semi-deserts, vegetation often self-organises into spatial patterns. On slopes, this typically consists of stripes of vegetation running parallel to the contours, separated by stripes of bare ground; this type of banded vegetation is sometimes known as Tiger bush. Many observational studies have reported slow movement of the stripes in the uphill direction. However, in a number of other cases the data points clearly to stationary patterns, and the question of movement remains controversial. The conclusion that is most consistent with available data is that some banded vegetation patterns move while others do not. Patterns in the former category have the form of periodic travelling waves.
- Travelling bands occur in oscillatory and excitable chemical reactions. They were observed in the 1970s in the Belousov–Zhabotinsky reaction and they formed an important motivation for the mathematical work done on periodic travelling waves at that time. More recent research has also exploited the capacity to link the experimentally observed bands with mathematical theory of periodic travelling waves via detailed modelling.
- Periodic travelling waves occur in the Sun, as part of the solar cycle. They are a consequence of the generation of the Sun's magnetic field by the solar dynamo. As such, they are related to sunspots.
- In hydrodynamics, convection patterns often involve periodic travelling waves. Specific instances include binary fluid convection and heated wire convection.
- Patterns of periodic travelling wave form occur in the "printer's instability", in which the thin gap between two rotating acentric cylinders is filled with oil.

== See also ==
- Plane wave
- Reaction–diffusion system
- Wave
