= Masao Doi =

Japanese polymer physicist

Masao Doi HonFInstP
- Born: March 29, 1948 (age 78)
- Education: University of Tokyo (Ph.D.)
- Employer: Nagoya University
- Known for: Doi–Peliti field theory
- Notable work: The Theory of Polymer Dynamics (1978)
- Awards: APS Polymer Physics Prize (2001); Bingham Medal (2001)
- Scientific career
- Fields: Soft matter
- Website: mdoi.jp/index_E.html

Masao Doi (土井正男, Doi Masao) (born 29 March 1948) is a Professor Emeritus at Nagoya University and The University of Tokyo. He is a Fellow of the Toyota Physical and Chemical Research Institute. In 1976, he introduced second quantized formalism for studying reaction-diffusion systems, which is now known as the Doi–Peliti field theory. In 1978 and 1979 he wrote a series of papers with Sir Sam Edwards expanding on the concept of reptation introduced by Pierre-Gilles de Gennes in 1971. In 1996 he authored the textbook Introduction to Polymer Physics.

== Recognition and awards ==
In 2001 the American Physical Society awarded Doi the Polymer Physics Prize for "pioneering contributions to the theory of dynamics and rheology of entangled polymers and complex fluids."

He was also awarded the Bingham Medal in 2001 by the Society of Rheology.

In 2016, he was elected a member of the National Academy of Engineering for contributions to the rheology of polymeric liquids, especially the entanglement effect in concentrated solutions and melts.
