= Phase space method =

In applied mathematics, the phase space method is a technique for constructing and analyzing solutions of dynamical systems, that is, solving time-dependent differential equations.

The method consists of first rewriting the equations as a system of differential equations that are first-order in time, by introducing additional variables. The original and the new variables form a vector in the phase space. The solution then becomes a curve in the phase space, parametrized by time. The curve is usually called a trajectory or an orbit. The (vector) differential equation is reformulated as a geometrical description of the curve, that is, as a differential equation in terms of the phase space variables only, without the original time parametrization. Finally, a solution in the phase space is transformed back into the original setting.

The phase space method is used widely in physics. It can be applied, for example, to find traveling wave solutions of reaction–diffusion systems.

== See also ==
- Reaction–diffusion system
- Fisher's equation
