= Patterned vegetation =

False color aerial view of tiger bush in Niger

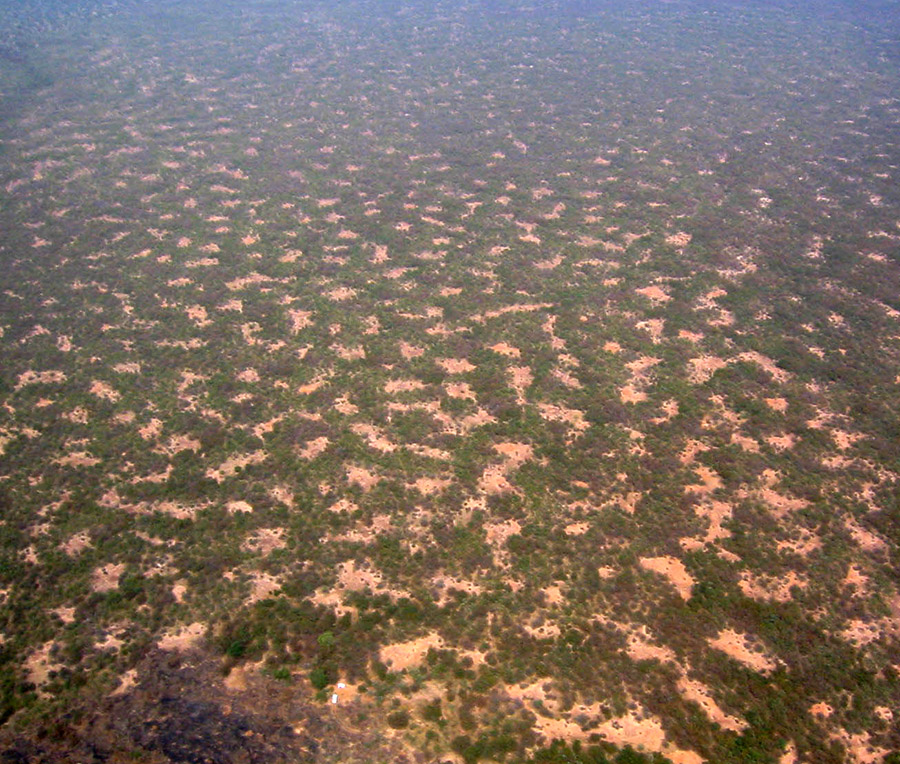
Aerial view of a gapped bush plateau in the W National Park, Niger. Average distance between two successive gaps is 50 meters.

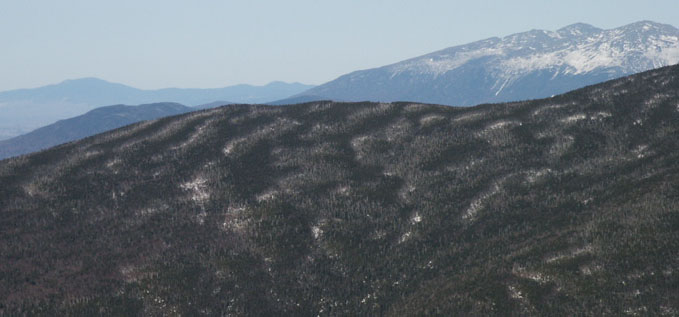
View of fir waves in the United States

Patterned vegetation is a vegetation community that exhibits distinctive and repetitive patterns. Examples of patterned vegetation include fir waves, tiger bush, and string bog. The patterns typically arise from an interplay of phenomena that differentially encourage plant growth or mortality. A coherent pattern arises because there is a strong directional component to these phenomena, such as wind in the case of fir waves, or surface runoff in the case of tiger bush. Patterns can include relatively evenly spaced patches, parallel bands, or some intermediate between those two. These patterns in the vegetation can appear without any underlying pattern in soil types, and are thus said to "self-organize" rather than be determined by the environment.

== Mechanisms ==
Several of the mechanisms underlying patterning of vegetation have been known and studied since at least the middle of the 20th century, however, mathematical models replicating them have only been produced much more recently. Self-organization in spatial patterns is often a result of spatially uniform states becoming unstable through the monotonic growth and amplification of nonuniform perturbations. A well-known instability of this kind leads to so-called Turing patterns. These patterns occur at many scales of life, from cellular development (where they were first proposed) to pattern formation on animal pelts to sand dunes and patterned landscapes (see also pattern formation). In their simplest form models that capture Turing instabilities require two interactions at differing scales: local facilitation and more distant competition. For example, when Sato and Iwasa produced a simple model of fir waves in the Japanese Alps, they assumed that trees exposed to cold winds would suffer mortality from frost damage, but upwind trees would protect nearby downwind trees from wind. Banding appears because the protective boundary layer created by the wind-most trees is eventually disrupted by turbulence, exposing more distant downwind trees to freezing damage once again.

When there is no directional resource flow across the landscape, spatial patterns may still appear in various regular and irregular forms along the rainfall gradient, including, in particular, hexagonal gap patterns at relatively high rainfall rates, stripe patterns at intermediate rates, and hexagonal spot patterns at low rates. The presence of a clear directionality to some important factor (such as a freezing wind or surface flow down a slope) favors the formation of stripes (bands), oriented perpendicular to the flow direction, in wider ranges of rainfall rates. Several mathematical models have been published that reproduce a wide variety of patterned landscapes, including semi-arid "tiger bush", hexagonal "fairy-circle" gap-patterns, woody-herbaceous landscapes, salt marshes, fog-dependent desert vegetation, and mires and fens.

Although not strictly vegetation, sessile marine invertebrates such as mussels and oysters, have also been shown to form banding patterns.

== See also ==
- Disturbance (ecology)
- Ecological succession
- Pattern formation
- Patterns in nature
- Spatial ecology
