= KPP–Fisher equation =

Partial differential equation in mathematics

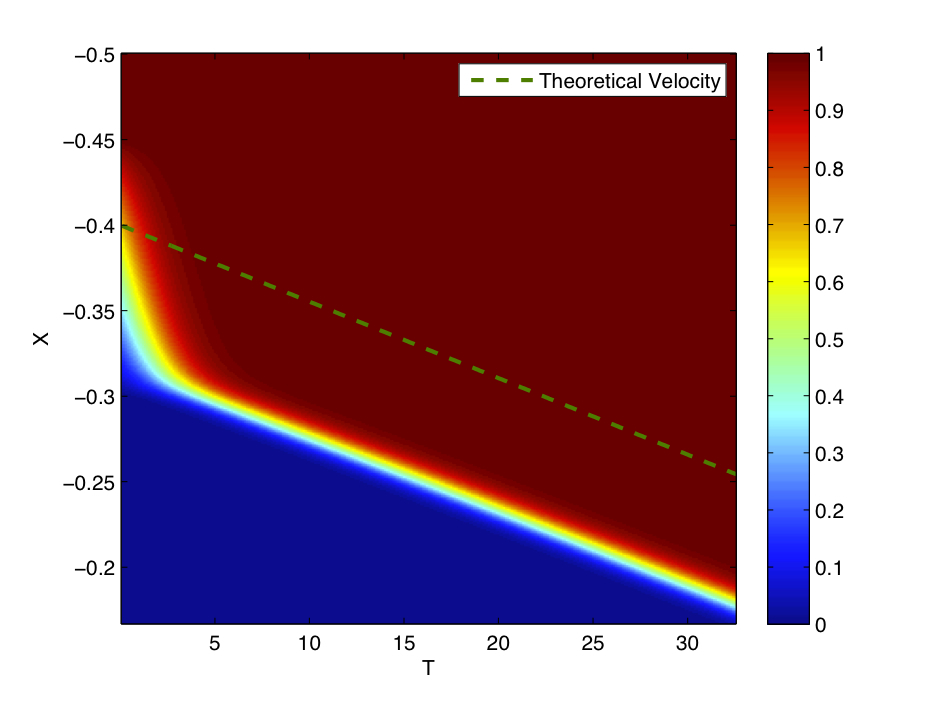
Numerical simulation of the Fisher–KPP equation. In colors: the solution u(t,x); in dots : slope corresponding to the theoretical velocity of the traveling wave.

In mathematics, Fisher-KPP equation (named after Ronald Fisher, Andrey Kolmogorov, Ivan Petrovsky, and Nikolai Piskunov) also known as the Fisher equation, Fisher–KPP equation, or KPP equation is the partial differential equation:

$\frac{\partial u}{\partial t} - D \frac{\partial^2 u}{\partial x^2} = r u(1-u).\,$

It is a kind of reaction–diffusion system that can be used to model population growth and wave propagation.

== Details ==
Fisher-KPP equation belongs to the class of reaction–diffusion equations: in fact, it is one of the simplest semilinear reaction-diffusion equations, the one which has the inhomogeneous term

$$f(u,x,t) = r u (1-u),\,$$

which can exhibit traveling wave solutions that switch between equilibrium states given by $f(u) = 0$. Such equations occur, e.g., in ecology, physiology, combustion, crystallization, plasma physics, and in general phase transition problems.

Fisher proposed this equation in his 1937 paper The wave of advance of advantageous genes in the context of population dynamics to describe the spatial spread of an advantageous allele and explored its travelling wave solutions. For every wave speed $c \geq 2 \sqrt{r D}$ ($c \geq 2$ in dimensionless form) it admits travelling wave solutions of the form

$$u(x,t)=v(x \pm ct)\equiv v(z),\,$$

where $\textstyle v$ is increasing and

$$\lim_{z\rightarrow-\infty}v\left(  z\right)  =0,\quad\lim_{z\rightarrow\infty }v\left(  z\right)  =1.$$

That is, the solution switches from the equilibrium state u = 0 to the equilibrium state u = 1. No such solution exists for c < 2. The wave shape for a given wave speed is unique. The travelling-wave solutions are stable against near-field perturbations, but not to far-field perturbations which can thicken the tail. One can prove using the comparison principle and super-solution theory that all solutions with compact initial data converge to waves with the minimum speed.

For the special wave speed $c=\pm 5/\sqrt{6}$, all solutions can be found in a closed form, with

$$v(z) = \left( 1 + C \mathrm{exp}\left(\mp{z}/{\sqrt6}\right) \right)^{-2}$$

where $C$ is arbitrary, and the above limit conditions are satisfied for $C>0$.

Proof of the existence of travelling wave solutions and analysis of their properties is often done by the phase space method.

== KPP equation ==
In the same year (1937) as Fisher, Kolmogorov, Petrovsky and Piskunov introduced the more general reaction-diffusion equation

$$\frac{\partial u}{\partial t}-\frac{\partial^2 u}{\partial x^2}=F(u)$$

where $F$ is a sufficiently smooth function with the properties that $F(0)=F(1)=0, F'(0)=r>0$ and $F(v)>0, F'(v)<r$ for all $0<v<1$. This too has the travelling wave solutions discussed above. Fisher's equation is obtained upon setting $F(u)=ru(1-u)$ and rescaling the $x$ coordinate by a factor of $\sqrt{D}$. A more general example is given by $F(u)=r u(1-u^q)$ with $q>0$. Kolmogorov, Petrovsky and Piskunov discussed the example with $q=2$ in the context of population genetics.

The minimum speed of a KPP-type traveling wave is given by

$$2\sqrt{\left.\frac{dF}{du}\right |_{u=0}}$$

which differs from other type of waves, see for example ZFK-type waves.

== See also ==
- ZFK equation
- Allen–Cahn equation
- KdV-Burgers-Fisher equation
