= Korteweg-de Vries-Burgers-Fisher equation =

Nonlinear partial differential equation

The KdV-Burgers-Fisher equation (or Koçak's equation) is a nonlinear partial differential equation,

$$\displaystyle \partial_t u + \mu \partial_x^3 u + \epsilon u \partial_x u -\nu \partial_x^2 u = ru(1-u)$$,

which combines different entities such as dispersion (from the Korteweg–de Vries equation), dissipation (from the Burgers' equation) and reaction (from the KPP–Fisher equation). The KdV-Burgers-Fisher equation is often abbreviated as the KBF equation or the KdVBF equation.

== See also ==
- Korteweg–de Vries equation
- Burgers' equation
- KPP–Fisher equation
