= Doi–Peliti field theory =

Field-theoretic formulation of stochastic particle systems

In statistical mechanics, Doi–Peliti field theory is a field-theoretic formalism for describing reaction–diffusion systems. Inspired by particle physics, it allows to tackle a classical many-body problem using the mathematical techniques of quantum field theory. A master equation of a stochastic process is rewritten in terms of creation and annihilation operators, allowing the dynamics to be reformulated using a path-integral formulation.

== History ==
The theory was first introduced in two papers by Masao Doi in 1976. It was reinvented by Peter Grassberger and Martin Scheunert in 1980 to be used in various applications. Luca Peliti learned about the formalism by Grassberger during a conference at the Centre Européen de Calcul Atomique et Moléculaire in September 1985. Peliti went forward to put Doi theory into path-integral formulation the same year and to apply it to describe reaction–diffusion systems using a renormalization group treatment. The theory was further popularized by John Cardy in the 2000s.

Doi remained mostly unaware of the developments of his theory. Doi first met Peliti in a meeting to celebrate the 50 years of its conception in September 2026.

== Formulation ==
Example of Feynman diagram decomposition. A diagramatic expansion is also allowed in Doi–Peliti field theory

The Doi–Peliti formalism does not require to find an effective field theory, one starts from rules cast into the master equation so the action is extracted from it. The method also does not require to start with Langevin equation or Fokker–Planck equation. Non-linearities are extracted from loop expansion.

The formalism is based on second quantization, mapping particle configurations to states in a Fock space, with creation and annihilation operators representing changes in particle number. The master equation governing the probability distribution is expressed as a time evolution equation for a state vector. By introducing coherent states, this operator formulation can be transformed into a path integral involving fields whose action encodes the stochastic dynamics.

The formalism follows the following steps:

1. Write the master equation
2. Rewrite master equation in terms of creation and annihilation operators $\hat{a},\hat{a}^\dagger$
3. Extract the action $\hat{\mathcal A}$ related to the time evolution, such that $\hat{\mathcal A}|\psi (t)\rangle = \frac{\mathrm d}{\mathrm d t}|\psi (t)\rangle$, where $|\psi (t)\rangle$ is the state of the system
4. Apply Doi shift (see section below)
5. Map each operator to a conjugate field $\hat{a}\to\hat{\phi}$ and $\hat{a}^\dagger\to\hat{\phi}^\dagger$
6. Fourier transform the resulting action in terms of fields from time to frequency space
7. Extract the bilinear part and determine the bare propagators
8. Start the perturbation theory and invoke renormalisation group methods

The advantage of this technique is that the dynamics is controlled by a relative simple (sometimes non-Hermitian) Hamiltonian. The difference with other stochatic methods is that the fields appearing in Doi–Peliti formalism are integrated out and have no direct physical interpretation.

== Doi shift ==
The Doi shift or Doi algebra is a change of variables used in the Doi–Peliti formalism, in which the creation operator is shifted according to

$$\hat{a}^\dagger \to 1+\hat{a}^\dagger,$$

for example, the following operator transforms as

$$\hat{\mathcal O} \propto (1-\hat{a}^\dagger)\hat a\rightarrow - \hat{a}^\dagger \hat a.$$

This transformation exploits probability conservation and simplifies the operator representation of stochastic dynamics, facilitating the derivation of the corresponding path integral and action functional. It also allows to recover a Jacobian of unity in the action.
