= Keller–Segel system =

Mathematical model of chemotaxis

The Keller–Segel system is a class of mathematical models describing the collective movement of cells or organisms in response to chemical signals, a process known as chemotaxis. It was first introduced in the 1970s by Evelyn Fox Keller and Lee Segel to explain the aggregation behavior of Dictyostelium discoideum, a slime mold that migrates and forms clusters in response to chemoattractants.

== Mathematical formulation ==
The most common form of the Keller–Segel model is a system of coupled nonlinear partial differential equations (PDEs). In its simplest parabolic–parabolic version, it is written as:

$$\begin{aligned}
\frac{\partial u}{\partial t} &= D_u \Delta u - \chi \nabla \cdot (u \nabla v), \\
\frac{\partial v}{\partial t} &= D_v \Delta v - \alpha v + \beta u,
\end{aligned}$$

where

- $u(x,t)$ represents the density of cells,
- $v(x,t)$ is the concentration of the chemoattractant,
- $D_u, D_v > 0$ are diffusion coefficients,
- $\chi > 0$ denotes chemotactic sensitivity,
- $\alpha, \beta$ are parameters for signal decay and production.

== Applications ==
The Keller–Segel system has been widely used in mathematical biology to study:

- bacterial chemotaxis,
- slime mold aggregation,
- tumor angiogenesis,
- and ecological population dynamics.

It has also served as a prototype model in applied mathematics, illustrating how nonlinear PDEs can capture pattern formation, blow-up phenomena, and self-organization.

== Mathematical properties ==
A major research focus concerns the global existence and blow-up of solutions. In two dimensions, the system exhibits a critical mass phenomenon: below a certain threshold of initial cell density, solutions remain globally bounded, while above it, solutions may blow up in finite time, modeling cell aggregation into singular clusters.

Extensions of the Keller–Segel model have been developed to study the formation and prevention of finite-time blow-up phenomena. These include models with nonlinear diffusion, cross-diffusion, volume-filling effects, logistic terms, and nonlocal reaction mechanisms, for which global existence or boundedness can be obtained under suitable conditions. Fractional and nonlocal versions of the model have also been studied in connection with anomalous diffusion and aggregation.. Tempered-fractional Keller–Segel systems have also been studied, with analytical results indicating long-term extinction under the corresponding tempered dynamics. This long-term extinction can be interpreted as the eventual loss of the chemotactic cell population when tempering limits long-range movement and reduces persistent population density.

== Experimental applications ==
The Keller-Segel equations have been used to describe chemotaxis of bacterial populations. To accurately describe experimental data, generalizations or modifications are often required, such as explicitly accounting for the chemotaxis log-sensing (Weber's law) capabilities within a finite dynamic range, non-linear signal production and decay, and hydrodynamic effects at high cell density.

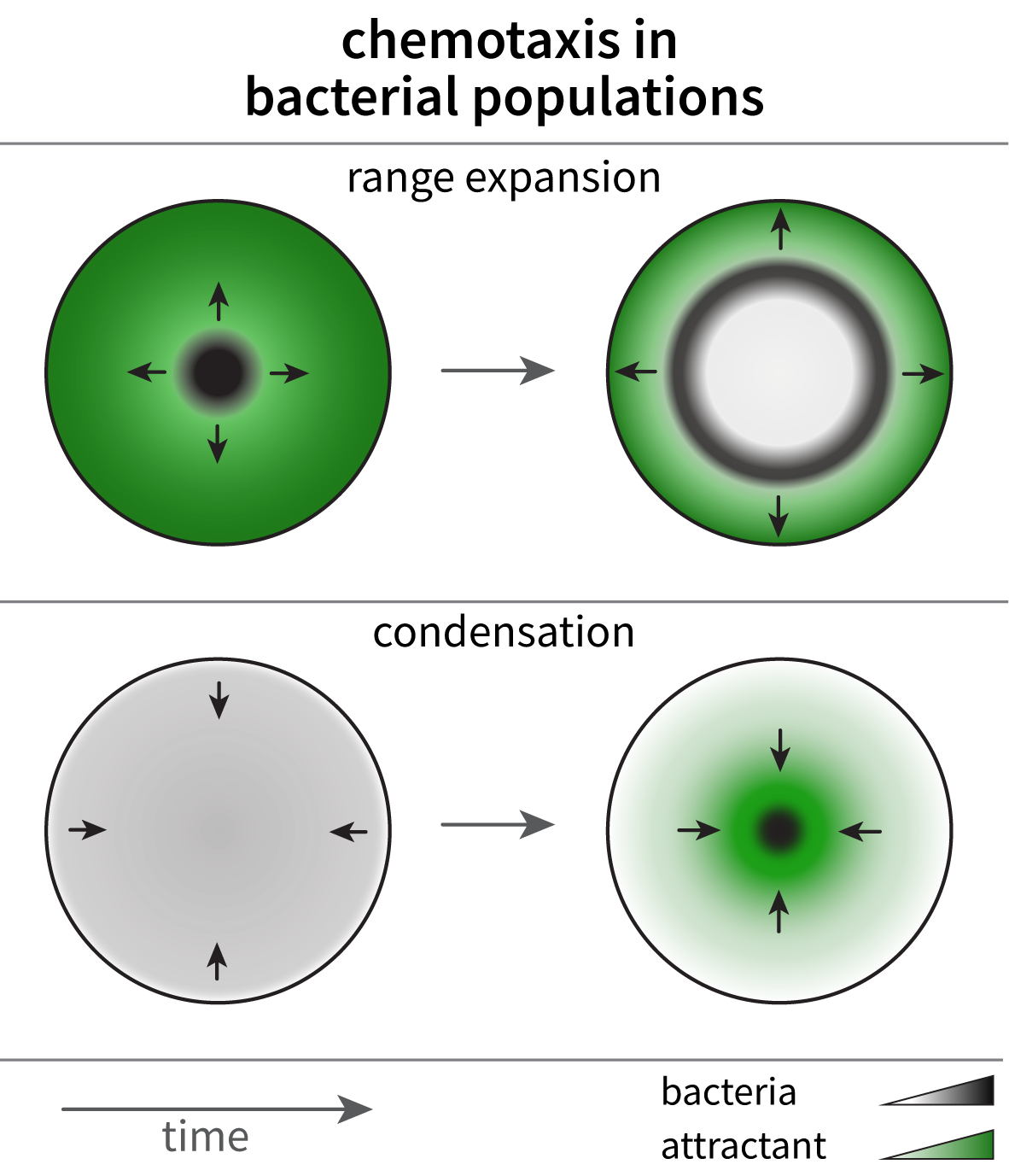
Illustration of bacterial condensation and range expansion

=== Range expansion ===
When cells are inoculated at the center of a soft-agar Petri dish, they grow and consume nutrients, collectively generating nutrient gradients that point toward uncolonized regions. Following these self-generated gradients leads to rapid range expansion that settles at a constant velocity. Models based on the Keller–Segel equations accurately describe such front propagation, including the shape of the outgoing bacterial front and its expansion rate.

=== Condensation and pattern formation ===
Bacteria may modify their chemical environment to attract one another and form macroscopic condensates. By secreting attractant molecules, bacteria chemotactically attract neighboring cells, creating positive feedback between signal production and cell accumulation. In a distinct mechanism, bacteria embedded in a uniform repellent environment spontaneously condense into millimeter-sized focal points through a chemotaxis-driven instability: cells locally remove repellent molecules, thereby attracting others. The Keller-Segel equations provide a framework to explain the instability onset, the shape of condensates, and their coalescence.

== See also ==
- Reaction–diffusion system
- Chemotaxis
