= Nikolai Piskunov =

Russian mathematician (1908–1977)

Nikolai Semenovich Piskunov
- Born: 9 May 1908; Froltsovo
- Died: 1977
- Known for: Kolmogorov–Petrovsky–Piskunov equation
- Awards: Honored Scientist of the RSFSR
- Scientific career
- Fields: Mathematics
- Institutions: Steklov Institute of Mathematics

Nikolai Semenovich Piskunov (Russian: Пискунов, Николай Семенович) (9 May 1908 – 1977) was a Soviet mathematician working mainly in the field of partial differential equations. He is known for the Kolmogorov–Petrovsky–Piskunov equation, a key model in mathematical population dynamics, and his textbook on differential and integral calculus which was used at many technical universities and was translated into several languages.

== Life ==
He was born in Froltsovo (Ivanovo Oblast) and graduated from Yaroslavl State Pedagogical University in 1929. He received his Doctor of Sciences in 1939. From 1941 he worked at the Steklov Institute of Mathematics of the Academy of Sciences of the Soviet Union. He is a Honored Scientist of the RSFSR (1965).

== Legacy ==
The Faculty of Engineering of the National University of Asunción (FIUNA) awards the Piskunov Prize since 2019 to the best two students at the faculty.

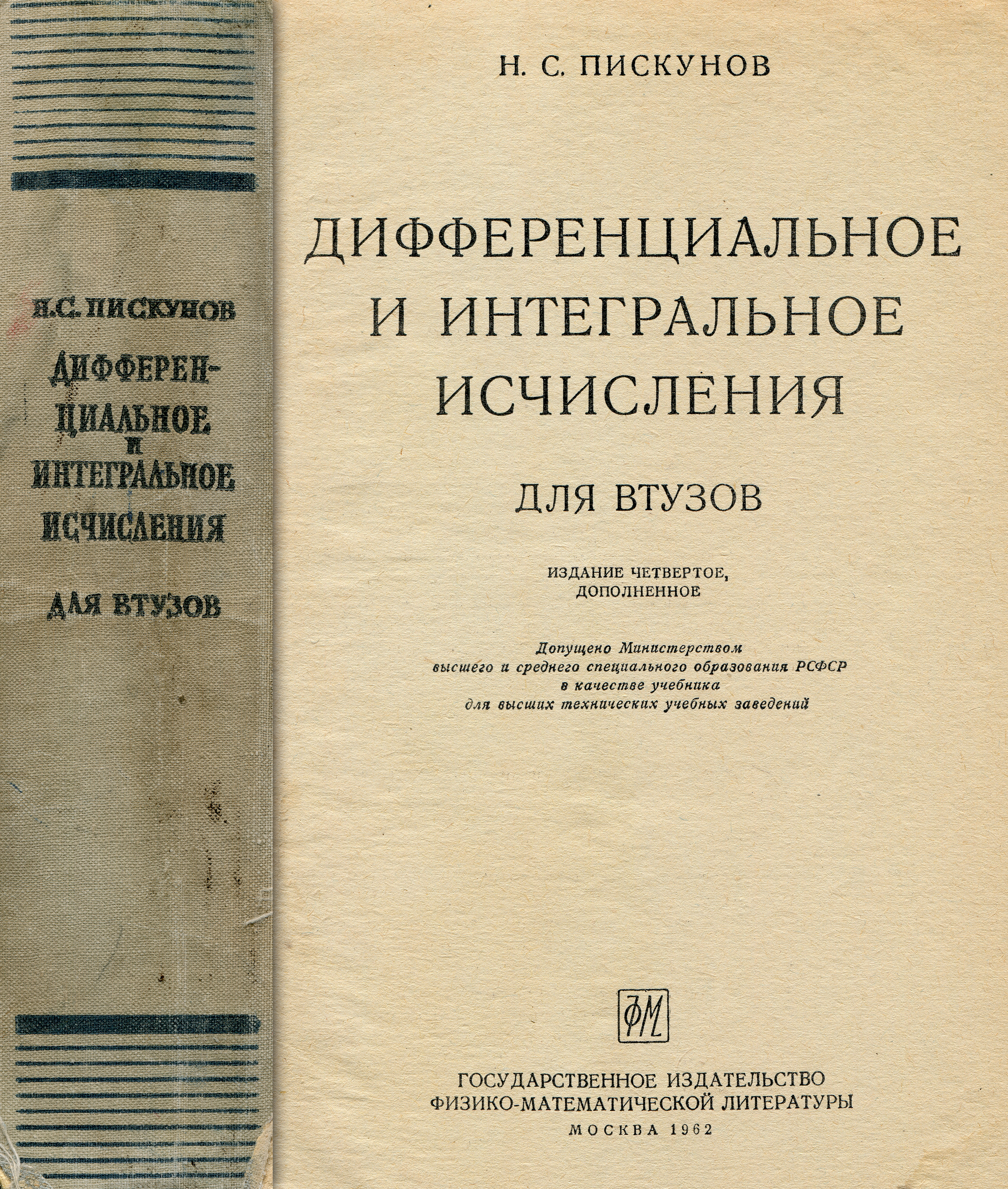
Differential and Integral Calculus

== Selected publications ==
- Piskunov, Nikolai (1965). Differential and Integral Calculus. P. Noordhoff.
- 29 publications including 14 books according to Zentralblatt MATH
