= Sergey Piskunov =

Ukrainian painter

- Сергій Вадимович Піскунов
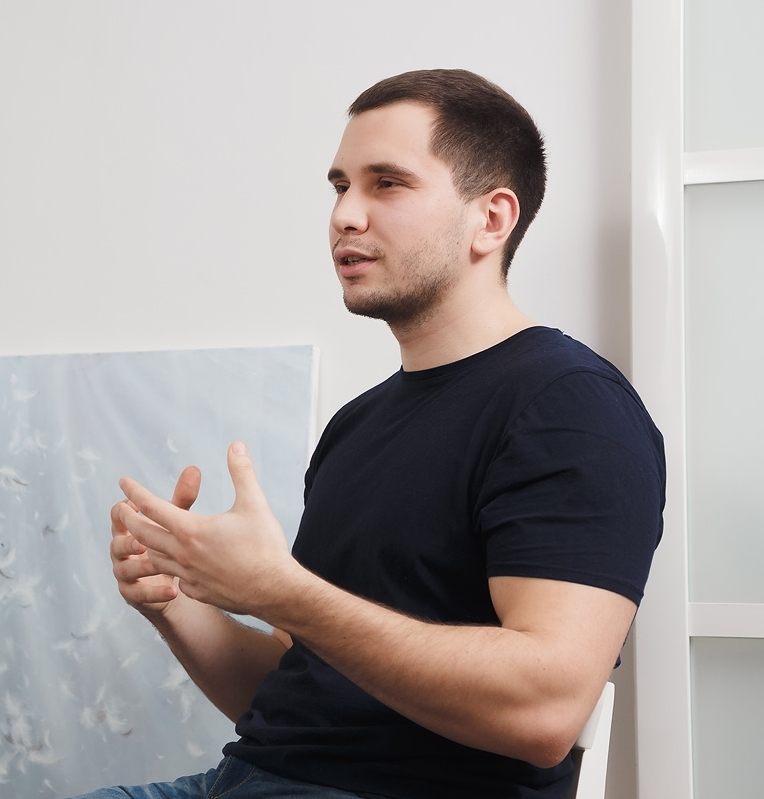
- Born: April 9, 1989 (age 37); Lysychansk, Luhansk Oblast, Ukrainian Soviet Socialist Republic, Soviet Union
- Education: Academy of the Customs Service of Ukraine
- Style: hyperrealism

Sergey Piskunov (Ukrainian: Сергій Вадимович Піскунов; born on April 9, 1989, Lysychansk) is a Ukrainian hyperrealism painter.

== Biography ==
Sergey Piskunov was born on April 9, 1989, in the city of Lysychansk, Luhansk Oblast. Graduated from the Academy of the Customs Service of Ukraine (2012) with a degree in Computer Science. In the third year of the academy, he began to self study fine arts, after he received brushes and paints as a gift from his future wife. Until the fifth year, Sergey held his first personal exhibition, and before graduation, he had already held three of his own exhibitions.

Upon completion of the study, he received a referral for employment at the State Customs Service of Ukraine, the chief inspector of the department of information systems and customs statistics in Kyiv. From 2013 to 2016 he worked as a software tester for Sybase, Amadeus, GlobalLogic, and Ciklum. After that, he devoted himself entirely to art. His work from the "Golden Masks" series, for which model Dasha Astafieva posed, became the winner of the Artboxproject in Miami 2018. Piskunov was also the winner of the Artist of the Future nomination for the Artist of the Future Contemporary Art Curator Magazine and the finalist of the Artist of the Year in the CIRCLE foundation among 668 other artists.

In 2018, Canadian model Coco Rocha starred in a photoshoot for his paintings. Sergey Piskunov has published in specialized publications on hyperrealism. His work is featured in London's Plus One Gallery, which specializes in hyperrealism.

== Exhibitions ==
- 2012 — Art Hall Gallery, Kyiv
- 2013 — Museum of Hetmanate, Kyiv
- 2013 — New Gallery, Kyiv
- 2013 — group exhibition, Kyiv
- 2013 — international Art Project, Kyiv
- 2013 — New Natura Morta, Kyiv
- 2013 — «Neo-Still Life», Expo Centre, Kyiv
- 2013 — Palace of Art, Lviv
- 2013 — Labyrinth, International Exhibition Centre, Kyiv
- 2013 — Heritage, International Exhibition Centre, Kyiv
- 2013 — exhibition of paintings Personal View, Art Development Foundation, Kyiv
- 2013 — Museum of Spiritual Treasures of Ukraine
- 2013 — Independent Dependence, Expo Centre, Kyiv
- 2013 — gallery «Lavra», Kyiv
- 2014 — Kraft Foods, Kyiv
- 2014 — group exhibition, Berlin
- 2015 — Zoom Gallery, Tel Aviv
- 2015 — Week of ART, London
- 2015 — Art Affordable, Singapore
- 2015 — art project, M17 Gallery, Kyiv
- 2016 — Museum Kavaleridze, Kyiv
- 2016 — Artbox Gallery, Switzerland
- 2017 — 101 Gallerie, Mexico
- 2017 — Zoom Gallery, Tel Aviv
- 2018 — Bartoux Gallery, Paris
- 2018 — Platinum Gallery, United States
- 2019 — Miami Art Week, Artbox project - finalist
- 2019 — Center of Modern Art, Yantai
- 2020 — Finalist of Circle foundation of the Arts, Artist of the year award

== Prizes ==
- 2020 - 100 Artists of the future, Contemporary Art Curator magazine- One of the 100 artists- United Kingdom
- 2019 - Artbox project Miami 2.0 - First prize- Miami, United States
