= Fir wave =

Set of alternating bands of fir trees in sequential stages of development

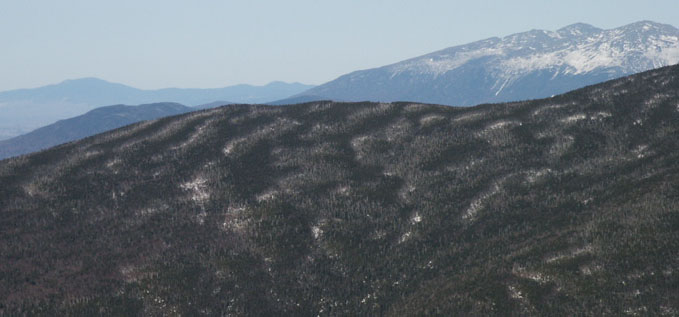
Winter view from Mt Garfield of fir waves on North Twin Mountain, White Mountains, New Hampshire

A fir wave is a set of alternating bands of fir trees in sequential stages of development, observed in forests on exposed mountain slopes in several areas, including northeastern North America and Japan. Fir waves develop by wave-regeneration following wind disturbance, and is one of various types of patterned vegetation.

== Formation ==
Fir waves form by the ecological process of wave-regeneration. When a tree falls, a gap in the canopy is formed. This exposes trees at the leeward edge of the gap to greater wind. These trees are thus more likely to die from damage and desiccation than windward trees. These leeward trees eventually die, gradually expanding the gap downwind. At the same time, young trees start to grow in the wind shadow in the windward portion of the gap, protected from the high winds by the surviving trees. The combination of dying trees at the leeward edge and regenerating trees at the windward edge results in the propagation of the fir waves in the direction of the predominant prevailing wind. The period of the waves is variable, typically about 60 years in balsam fir (Abies balsamea). One can view these from the Appalachian Trail as it ascends the Hunt Spur of Mount Katahdin in Maine. "Looking out to the Owl" and "The Brothers" are extensive areas of this phenomenon.

== See also ==
- Temperate coniferous forests
