= Run-on =

In hydrology, the process or measure of surface water infiltration

In hydrology, run-on refers to surface runoff from an external area that flows on to an area of interest. A portion of run-on can infiltrate once it reaches the area of interest. Run-on is common in arid and semi-arid areas with patchy vegetation cover and short but intense thunderstorms. In these environments, surface runoff is usually generated by a failure of rainfall to infiltrate into the ground quickly enough (this runoff is termed infiltration excess overland flow). This is more likely to occur on bare soil, with low infiltration capacity. As runoff flows downslope, it may run-on to ground with higher infiltration capacity (such as beneath vegetation) and then infiltrate.

Run-on is an important process in the hydrological and ecohydrological behaviour of semi-arid ecosystems. Tiger bush is an example of a vegetation community that develops a patterned structure in response to, in part, the generation of runoff and run-on.

== See also ==
- Stormwater
