= Sergei Piskunov =

Russian ice hockey player

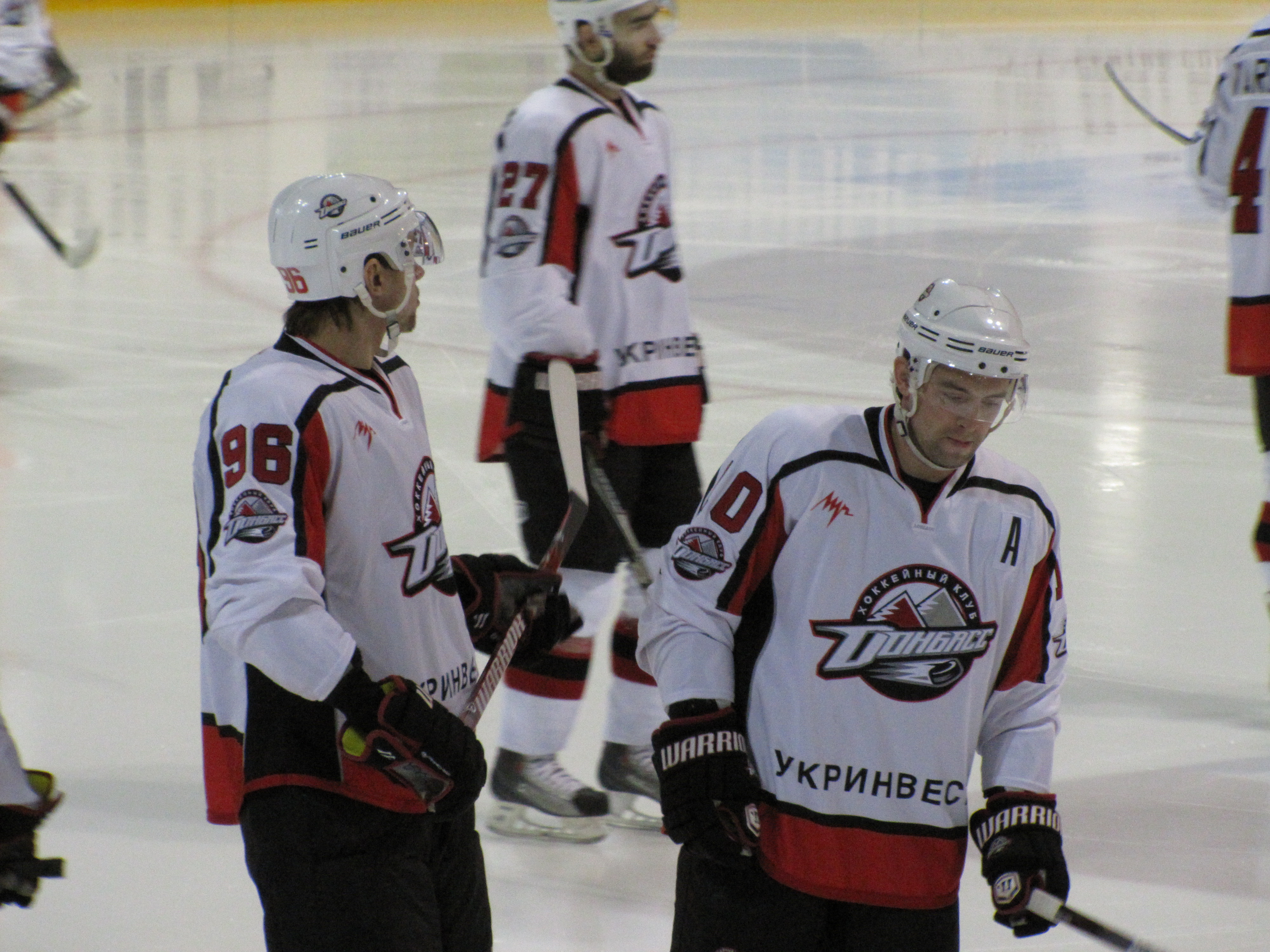
- Born: March 11, 1981 (age 44) Magnitogorsk, Russia
- Height: 5 ft 9 in (175 cm)
- Weight: 185 lb (84 kg; 13 st 3 lb)
- Position: Left wing
- Shot: Right
- VHL team Former teams: HC Donbass; KHL; Amur Khabarovsk
- NHL draft: Undrafted
- Playing career: 2000–2023

Sergei Piskunov (born March 11, 1981) is a Russian professional ice hockey winger who currently plays for HC Donbass of the Russian Major League (VHL).

== Career statistics ==
			Regular season					Playoffs
Season	Team	League	GP	G	A	Pts	PIM	GP	G	A	Pts	PIM
1997–98	Metallurg Magnitogorsk-2	Russia3	18	6	2	8	10	—	—	—	—	—
1998–99	Metallurg Magnitogorsk-2	Russia3	37	17	19	36	12	—	—	—	—	—
1999–00	Metallurg Magnitogorsk-2	Russia3	34	18	15	33	42	—	—	—	—	—
2000–01	Metallurg Magnitogorsk	Russia	19	1	1	2	8	2	0	0	0	0
2000–01	Metallurg Magnitogorsk-2	Russia3	26	23	14	37	18	—	—	—	—	—
2001–02	Metallurg Magnitogorsk	Russia	13	0	0	0	4	3	0	0	0	2
2001–02	Metallurg Magnitogorsk-2	Russia3	18	7	9	16	14	—	—	—	—	—
2002–03	Metallurg Magnitogorsk	Russia	13	1	1	2	0	—	—	—	—	—
2002–03	Metallurg Magnitogorsk-2	Russia3	28	16	18	34	46	—	—	—	—	—
2002–03	HC CSKA Moscow	Russia	6	1	0	1	4	—	—	—	—	—
2002–03	HC CSKA Moscow-2	Russia3	4	1	2	3	26	—	—	—	—	—
2003–04	Metallurg Magnitogorsk	Russia	29	5	4	9	16	8	1	1	2	2
2003–04	Metallurg Magnitogorsk-2	Russia3	20	10	16	26	60	—	—	—	—	—
2004–05	Metallurg Magnitogorsk	Russia	23	7	4	11	12	—	—	—	—	—
2004–05	Metallurg Magnitogorsk-2	Russia3	22	16	10	26	36	—	—	—	—	—
2005–06	Severstal Cherepovets	Russia	47	8	6	14	48	3	0	0	0	4
2006–07	Severstal Cherepovets	Russia	31	9	2	11	26	3	0	0	0	2
2006–07	Severstal Cherepovets-2	Russia3	1	0	2	2	2	—	—	—	—	—
2007–08	Severstal Cherepovets	Russia	52	13	12	25	34	8	0	0	0	4
2008–09	Severstal Cherepovets	KHL	42	6	12	18	22	—	—	—	—	—
2009–10	Severstal Cherepovets	KHL	25	1	0	1	4	—	—	—	—	—
2009–10	HC Lipetsk	Russia2	6	2	4	6	0	4	1	0	1	6
2010–11	Amur Khabarovsk	KHL	8	2	0	2	2	—	—	—	—	—
2010–11	Traktor Chelyabinsk	KHL	41	8	6	14	16	—	—	—	—	—
2011–12	Donbass Donetsk	VHL	53	16	21	37	48	10	3	6	9	16
2012–13	HC Kuban	VHL	51	9	14	23	36	—	—	—	—	—
2013–14	HC Kuban	VHL	14	2	2	4	2	—	—	—	—	—
2013–14	Molot-Prikamye Perm	VHL	20	6	8	14	12	15	3	6	9	16
2014–15	Molot-Prikamye Perm	VHL	52	10	8	18	34	12	4	2	6	4
2015–16	Molot-Prikamye Perm	VHL	47	9	13	22	24	6	1	1	2	4
2016–17	Debreceni Hoki Klub	MOL Liga	38	17	31	48	42	10	3	5	8	2
2019–20	HK Cheboksary	Russia3	17	2	4	6	8	—	—	—	—	—
2022–23	HK Serov	Russia Regional	5	5	5	10	2	—	—	—	—	—
KHL totals			116	17	18	35	44	—	—	—	—	—
Russia totals			233	45	30	75	152	27	1	1	2	14
VHL totals			237	52	66	118	156	43	11	15	26	28
