= On the Run =

On the Run may refer to:

- "On the run", a phrase often used to describe a fugitive, a person fleeing custody

== Literature ==
- On the Run (novel), by Nina Bawden
- On the Run: Fugitive Life in an American City, a non-fiction work by sociologist Alice Goffman
- On the Run, a novel series by Gordon Korman
- On the Run, a novel in the Sweet Valley High series
- On the Run, an autobiography by Philip Agee
- On the Run, the tenth book in the Left Behind: The Kids series

== Film and television ==
=== Film ===
- On the Run (1958 film), a British drama directed by Ernest Morris
- On the Run (1963 film), a British mystery thriller directed by Robert Tronson
- On the Run (1982 film), an Australian thriller directed by Mende Brown
- On the Run (1988 film), a Hong Kong action thriller directed by Alfred Cheung
- On the Run (1999 film), an American crime comedy directed by Bruno de Almeida
- On the Run (2003 film), a French-Belgian film by Lucas Belvaux

=== Television ===
- On the Run, a program on the Discovery Channel
- "On the Run" (Animorphs), a 1998 episode
- "On the Run" (The Bionic Woman), a 1978 episode
- "On the Run" (Steven Universe), a 2015 episode
- "On the Run" (What We Do in the Shadows), a 2020 episode

== Music ==
=== Albums ===
- On the Run! (Jay Chou album), 2007
- On the Run (Children 18:3 album), 2012
- On the Run, a 2009 album by Jason Hartman
- On the Run, a 1986 album by Jon Gibson
- On the Run, Live at the Velvet Lounge, an album by Fred Anderson
- On the Rvn, a 2018 extended play by Young Thug

=== Tours ===
- On the Run (Paul McCartney), a 2011 concert tour by Paul McCartney
- On the Run Tour (Beyoncé and Jay-Z), a 2014 concert tour by Beyoncé and Jay-Z (also known as The Carters)
- On the Run II Tour, a 2018 concert tour by Beyoncé and Jay-Z (also known as The Carters)

=== Songs ===
- "On the Run" (instrumental), by Pink Floyd, 1973
- "On the Run" (Falco song), or "Auf der Flucht", 1982
- "On the Run" (Kool G Rap & DJ Polo song), 1992
- "On the Run" (OMC song), 1997
- "Part II (On the Run)", by Jay-Z, featuring Beyoncé, 2014
- "On the Run", by Blackfoot from Tomcattin', 1980
- "On the Run", by Electric Light Orchestra from Discovery, 1979
- "On the Run", by Glass Animals from I Love You So F***ing Much, 2024
- "On the Run", by Kaiser Chiefs from Start the Revolution Without Me, 2012
- "On the Run", by Manfred Mann's Earth Band from Chance, 1980
- "On the Run", by Natalie Imbruglia from Counting Down the Days, 2005
- "On the Run", by Rascalz from Global Warning, 1999
- "On the Run", by Royce da 5'9" from Street Hop, 2009
- "On the Run", by Sam Roberts from We Were Born in a Flame, 2003
- "On the Run", by Tamta from Awake, 2020
- "On the Run", by Tillmann Uhrmacher, 2001
- "On the Run", by Tina Dico from Count to Ten, 2007
- "On the Run", by Toto from Toto XX, 1998

== Other uses ==
- On the Run (convenience store), an international chain developed by ExxonMobil
- On the run (finance), the most recently issued (and hence most liquid) maturity of a contract
