= Tiger bush =

Topographic lines of vegetation arising from differential absorption of rainfall

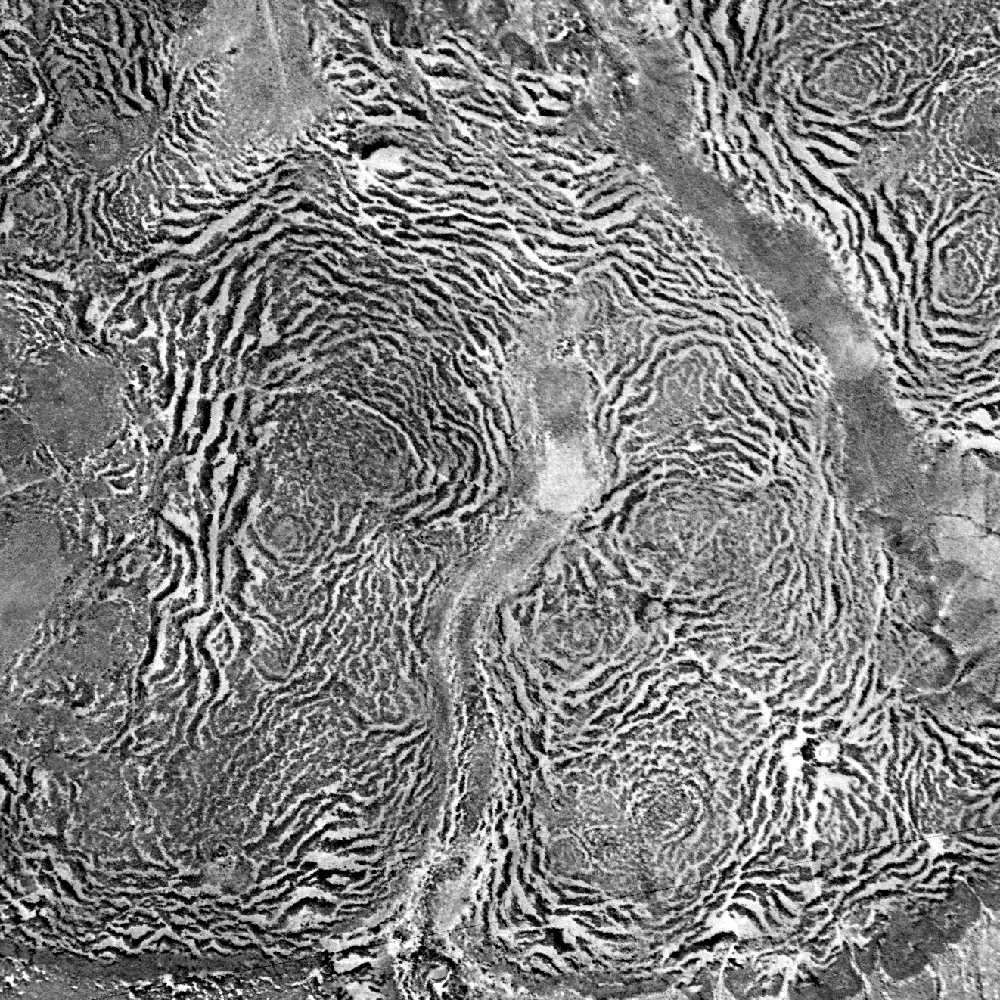
Aerial view of a tiger bush plateau in Niger. Vegetation appears in dark while lighter pixels represent bare soil. The distance between successive vegetated bands varies between 60 and 120 meters.

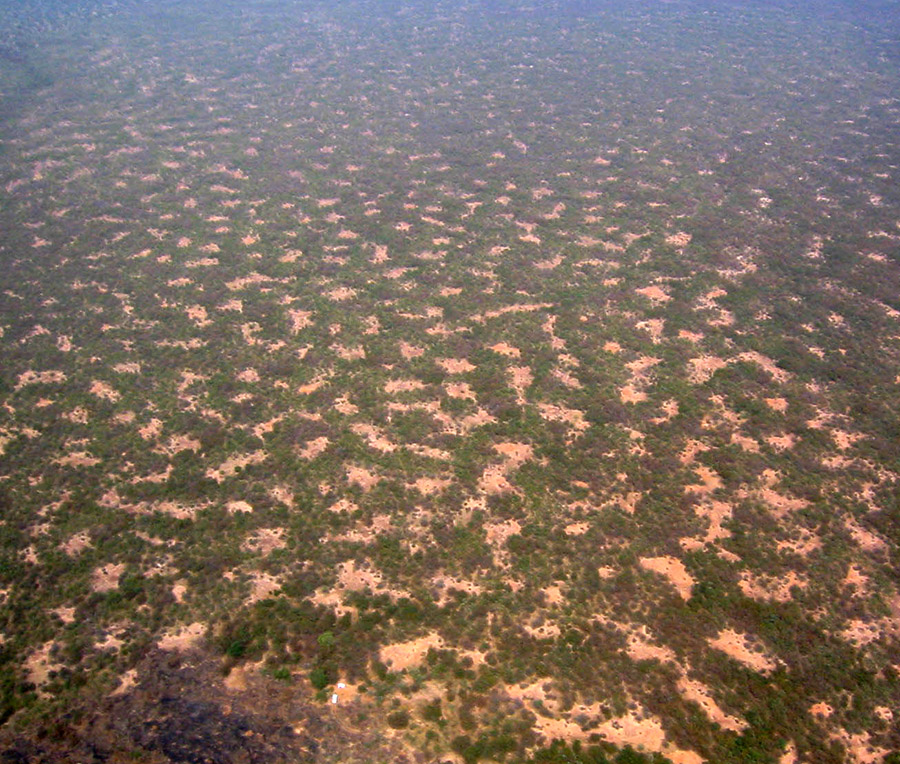
Aerial oblique view of a gapped bush plateau in W National Park, Niger. The mean distance between two consecutive gaps is 50 meters

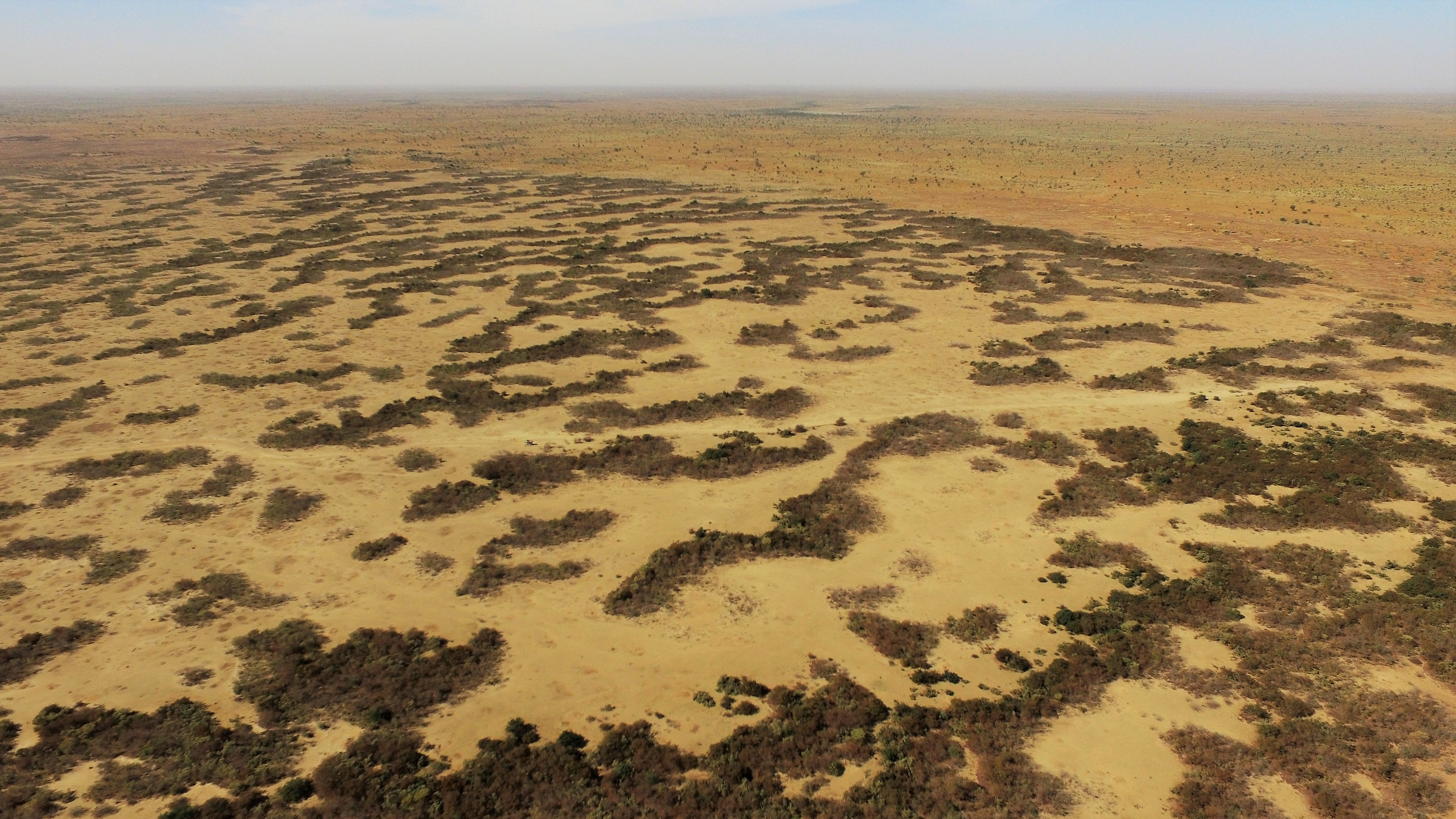
Aerial view of a tiger bush area in Niger with its typical vegetation pattern. There is a sharp boundary between the tiger bush area and the distant Sahelian plain where the vegetation is much sparser.

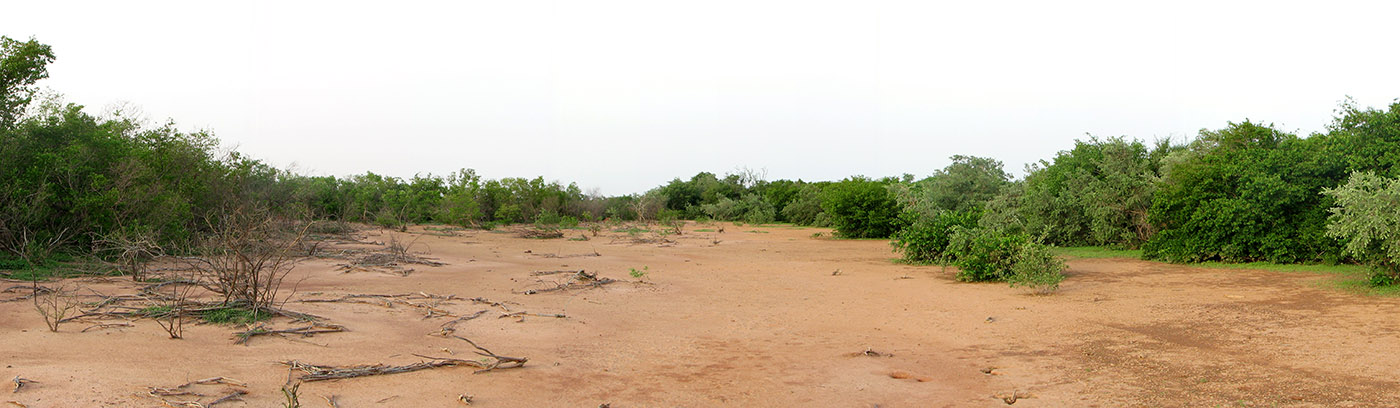
Panoramic view taken from the middle of a bare band in a tiger bush plateau near Batama-Béri, Niger. Altitude decrease from left to right (slope is about one percent).

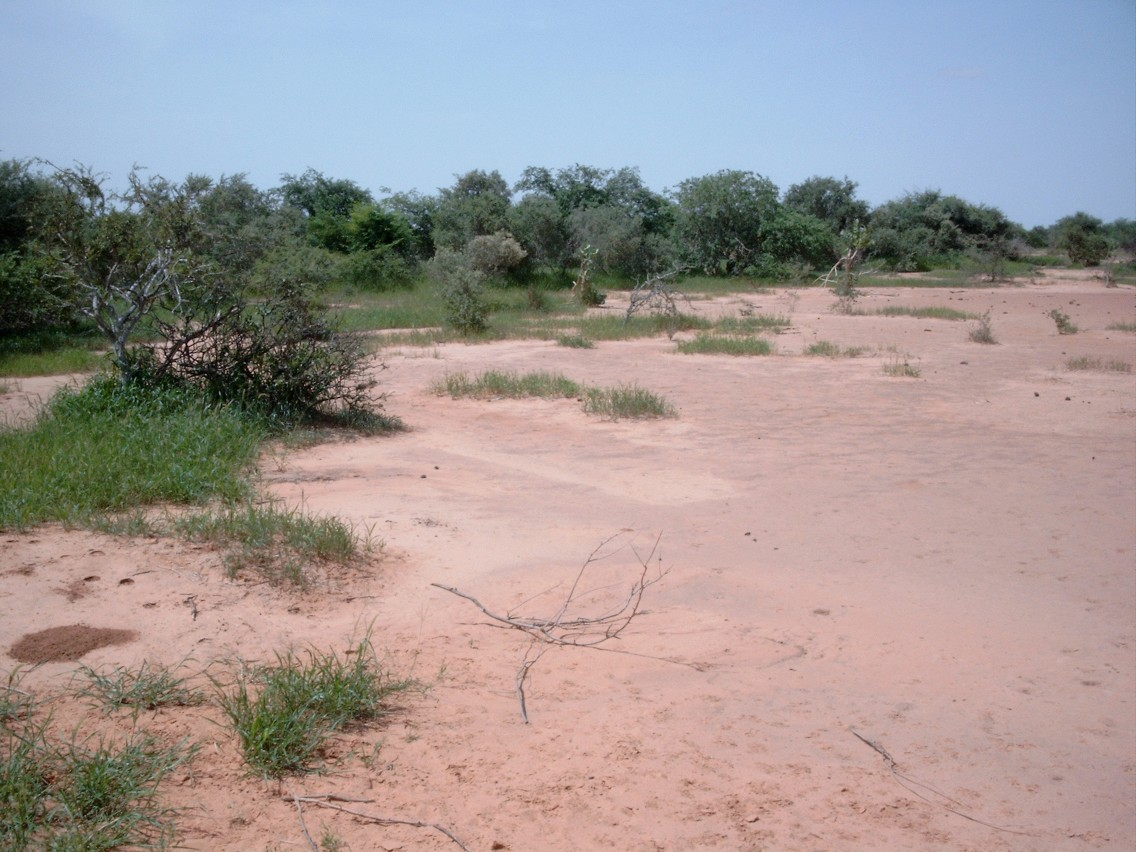
Vegetation band in a tiger bush near Zamarkoye, Burkina Faso.

Tiger bush, or brousse tigrée in French, is a patterned vegetation community and ground consisting of alternating bands of trees, shrubs, or grass separated by bare ground or low herb cover, that run roughly parallel to contour lines of equal elevation. The patterns occur on low slopes in arid and semi-arid regions, such as in Australia, Sahelian West Africa, and North America.

Due to the natural water harvesting capacity, many species in tiger bush usually occur only under a higher rainfall regime.

== Formation ==
The alternating pattern arises from the interplay of hydrological, ecological, and erosional phenomena. In the regions where tiger bush is present, plant growth is water-limited - the shortage of rainfall prevents vegetation from covering the entire landscape. Instead, trees and shrubs are able to establish by either tapping soil moisture reserves laterally or by sending roots to deeper, wetter soil depths. By a combination of plant litter, root macropores, and increased surface roughness, infiltration into the soil around the base of these plants is enhanced. Surface runoff arriving at these plants will thus likely to become run-on, and infiltrate into the soil.

By contrast, the areas between these larger plants contain a greater portion of bare ground and herbaceous plants. Both bare soil, with its smoother surface and soil crusts, and herbaceous plants, with fewer macropores, inhibit infiltration. This causes much of the rainfall that falls in the inter-canopy areas to flow downslope, and infiltrate beneath the larger plants. The larger plants are in effect harvesting rainfall from the ground immediately up-slope.

Although these vegetation patterns may seem very stable through time, such patterning requires specific climatic conditions. For instance, a decrease in rainfall is able to trigger patterning in formerly homogeneous vegetation within a few decades.

More water will infiltrate at the up-slope edge of the canopies than down-slope. This favours the establishment and growth of plants at the up-slope edge, and mortality of those down-slope. Differences in growth and mortality across the vegetation band result in the band moving gradually upslope.

Tiger bush never develops on moderate to steep slopes, because in these cases surface runoff concentrates into narrow threads or rills instead of flowing over the surface as sheet flow. Sheet flow distributes water more evenly across a hillslope, allowing a continuous vegetation band to form.

The exact roles and importance of the different phenomena is still the subject of research, especially of research in physics since the 1990s.

== Exploitation and conservation ==
The woody plants which make up tiger bush are used for fire wood and as a source of foliage for grazers. The extensive loss of tiger bush around Niamey, Niger, now threatens local giraffe populations. In neighbouring Burkina Faso, the tiger bush vegetation is also declining.

== Scientific research ==
The pattern was first described in 1950 in British Somaliland by W.A. Macfadyen. The term tiger bush was first coined by Albert Clos-Arceduc in 1956.

== See also ==
- Ecohydrology
- Patterns in nature
