= Tatyana Sherstyuk =

Russian artist and art curator

- Татьяна Шерстюк
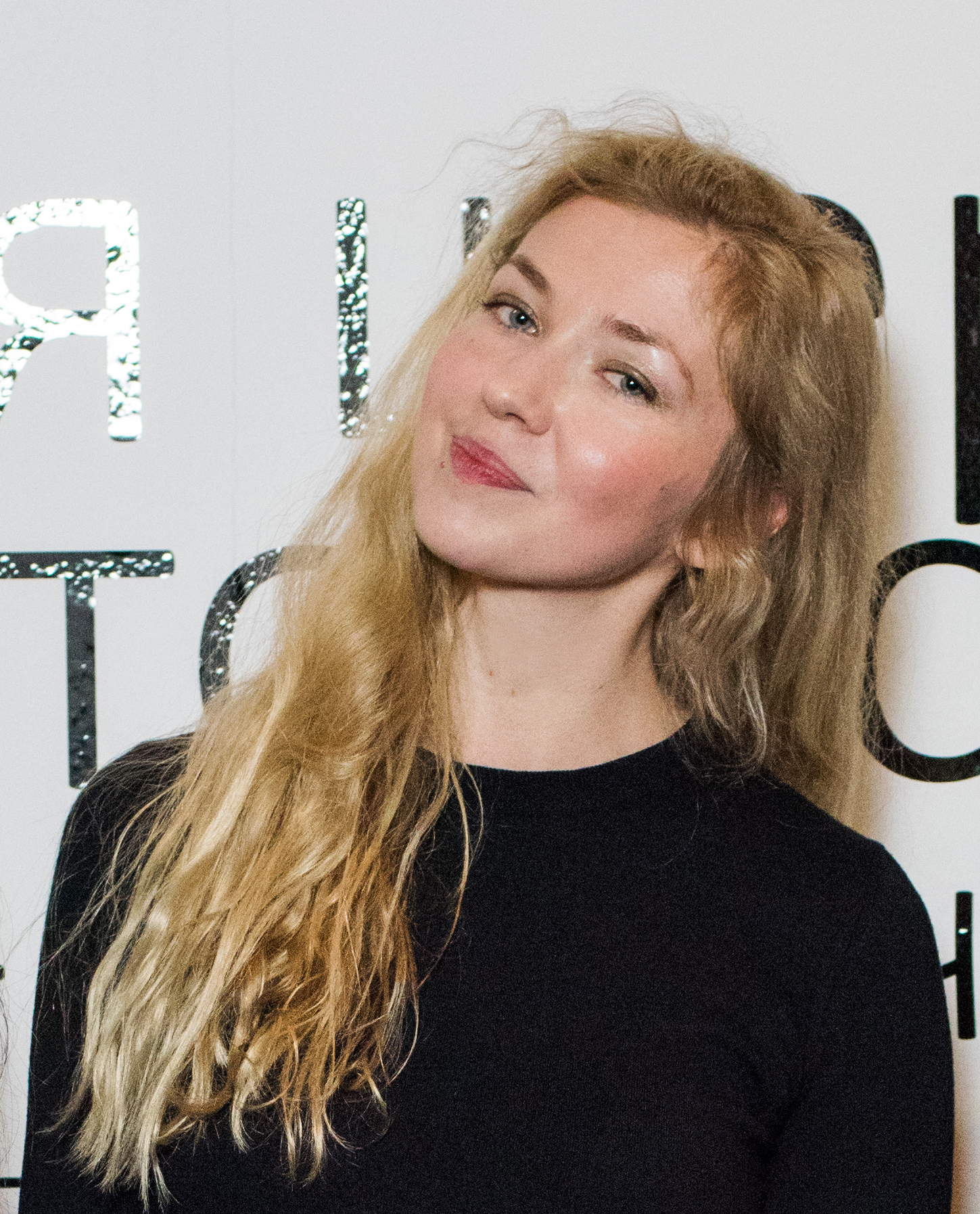
- Born: August 10, 1981 (age 45)

Tatyana Sherstyuk (Russian: Татьяна Шерстюк, born August 10, 1981) is a Russian artist and curator based in Moscow.

== Life and work ==
Tatyana was born on August 10, 1981. In 2003 she gained MFA degree with a diploma at Moscow State Textile University at the faculty of Applied Arts. In 2004 she was accepted to the school of Postgraduate Education at Parsons School of Design at New York City, United States. In 2006 she was released from Institute of Television and Radio Ostankino. In 2009 she majored in contemporary art at the Institute of Contemporary Art Moscow.

Tatyana creates conceptual installations. Her art is influenced by collaboration with representatives of Moscow Conceptualism. She has participated in Russian and international exhibitions from 2001, including Dakar Biennale, Moscow Biennale, Moscow International Biennale for Young Art. Among her art projects, there are independent as well as collaborative projects with Anton Nikolaev, Denis Mustafin, Alexey Sysoev, Victor Skersis, Nedda Al-Madani, and Ksenia Podoynitsina. Her artworks are owned by personal and museum collections.

In 2016, Tatyana played a leading role in the movie Raison D'Etre. In 2017 and 2018, she was included to the list of acknowledged artists of Russia Inart. From 2018, she has given lectures on contemporary art. In 2019 she won a VI Session of program of "Factory studios" (Center of Creative Industries "FABRIKA") a category "Exhibition at Fabrika".

== Solo exhibitions ==
=== 2013 ===
"Leftovers" – solo exhibition at Center of Creative Industries "FABRIKA", Moscow.

=== 2017 ===
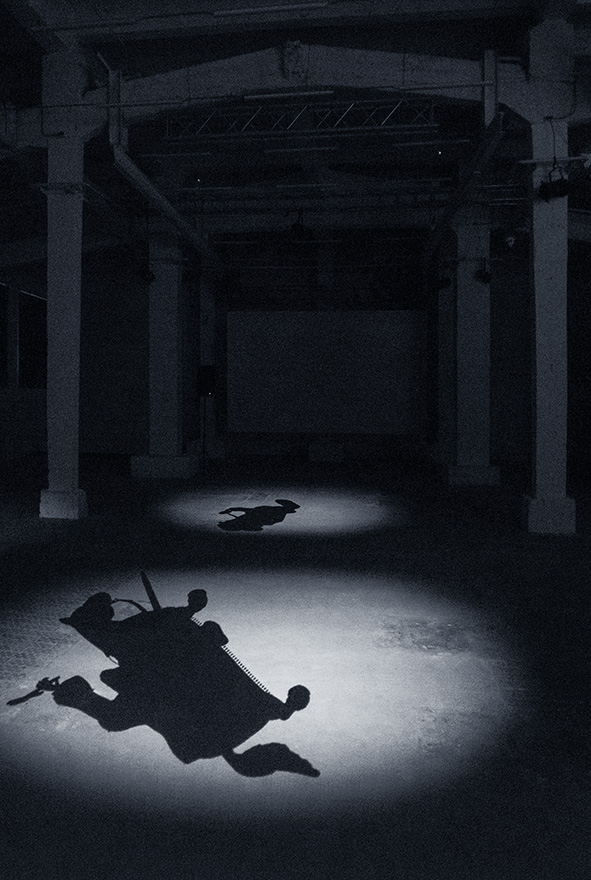

"Hic Sunt Dracones" (Latin "Here Live Dragons") – solo exhibition consisted from a total audio-visual installation at Center of Creative Industries.

"FABRIKA", Moscow. Music for the installation was written by a contemporary music composer Alexey Sysoev at 2017.

=== 2018 ===
"Owls are not what they seem" joint exhibition together with Victor Skersis, Gallery 21, Moscow Contemporary Art Center Winzavod, Moscow.

Nike is losing her head at the date with a snowman. Venus is exchanging her shadow with Apollo where the shadow turns into a rabbit, and after into a duck…These narratives are rhythmed and turn into a poetry of a size of a gallery. They fly of like a refrain by the exhibition of two artists of different generations – a legendary Victor Skersis from art team "Nest" and a young inheritor of "Analytical conceptualism": Tatyana Sherstyuk. A poem written by with spectacular illusions is named "Owls are not what they seem". Maria Moskvicheva (a journalist, an historian, a culturologist, an art columnist of Moskovky Kmsololets Newspaper, a member of Association of Art Critics (AIS).

=== 2019 ===
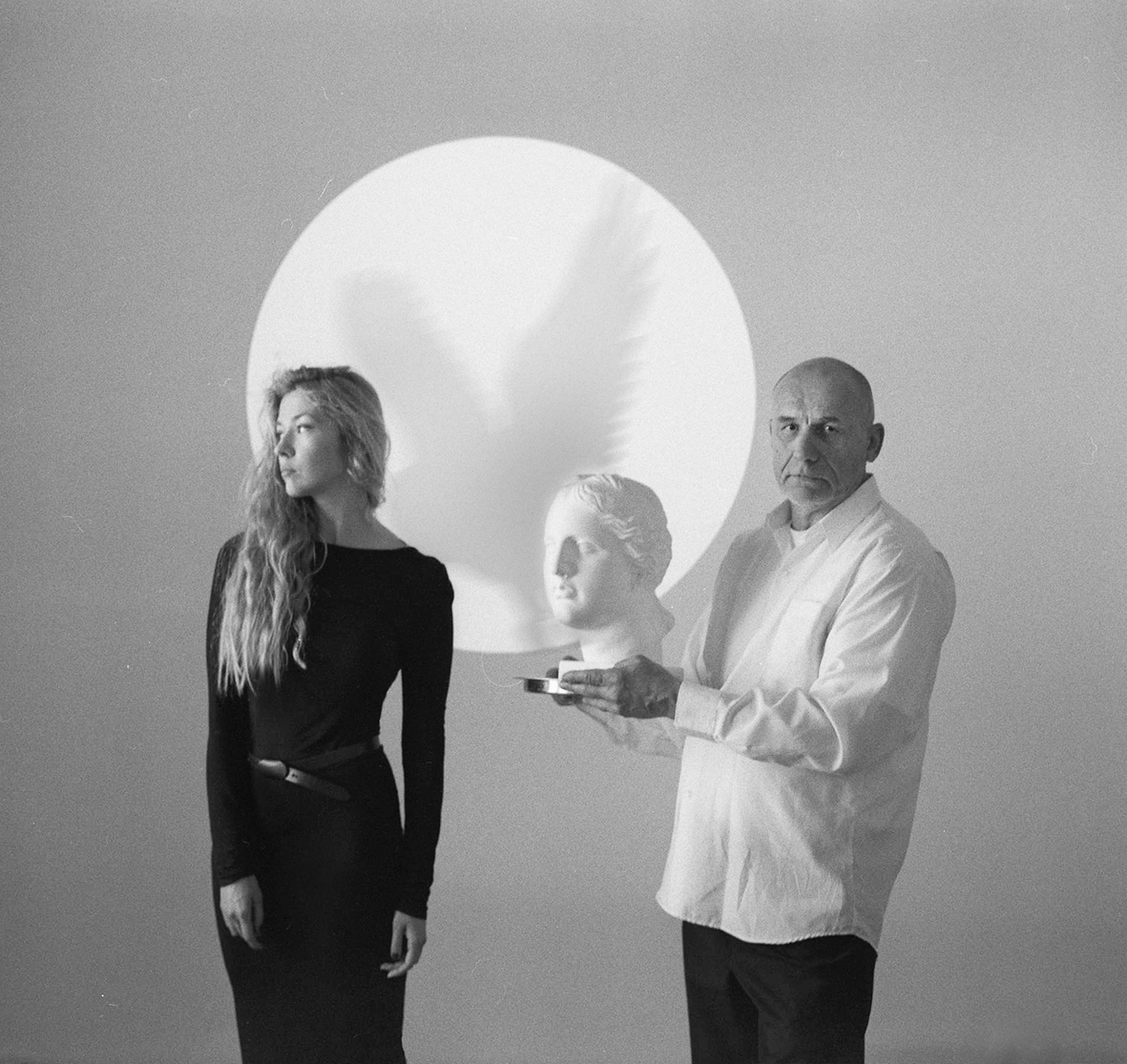

"72 spins around a significant other", Center of Creative Industries "FABRIKA", Moscow.

=== 2020 ===
“A way of transformations. How I became a shadow of a cat”, practices of shshsh at special project of VII Moscow International Biennale for Young Art.

== Group exhibitions ==
=== 2001 ===
- "The Number", Moscow Museum of Unesco, Moscow
- "The Number", Central House of Artist, Moscow
- "The Number", "Agit Plakat" Gallery, Moscow
- "The Number", "100 Years of Russian Poster", Tretyakov Gallery, Moscow.

=== 2004 ===
- "Mokosh", Tretyakov Gallery, Moscow

=== 2009 ===
- Happy Today", Central House of Artist, Moscow
- "Happy Today", 3d Moscow Biennale, Red October, Moscow

=== 2010 ===
- "Autonomy" – alternative festival of young contemporary art festival "Stop! Where are you going?", Moscow
- Exactly that", Zverev Center, Moscow
- Oh really!!!", Eastern Gallery, Moscow
- Personal", "Objective" KEC, Moscow
- "Oh really!!!", project " Freedom", Moscow

=== 2011 ===
- "Forest for forest", 4 Moscow Biennale, Moscow.
- "cat in a box", "Cat's party", ArtPlay Gallery, Moscow.
- "Media fishtank", "55/33" ArtPlay Gallery, Moscow.
- "Dresses for walls", "From the opposite"Moscow Contemporary Art Center Winzavod.
- "Express", project "No art" Gallery, Moscow Contemporary Art Center Winzavod.

=== 2012 ===
- "SothBus" Charity Auction, Design factory "Flacon", Moscow.
- "We are Skiffs", Zverev Center, Moscow.

=== 2013 ===
- "New Year greetings of president", Shchusev Museum of Architecture, special project of Moscow Biennale, Moscow

=== 2015 ===
- "Dresses for walls", "Playing human", Ground Gallery, Moscow.
- Q1=Q2, Young International Biennale of Contemporary Art, Guslitsa art residence, Guslitsa.
- "Leftovers", Imagio Mundi, Dakar Biennale

=== 2017 ===
- "Institute of very contemporary art – in fact – Bakstein", Moscow Museum of Modern Art, Moscow.
- "Dresses for walls", "Playtime", Gallery 21, Moscow Contemporary Art Center Winzavod
- "Deconstruction", InArt, Moscow
- "New Year greetings of president" made in collaboration with Anton Nikolaev, "Men's work", Museum of Contemporary Art, Ekaterinburg

=== 2019 ===
- "Dachnoe Tsaritsyno", group exhibition at Tsaritsyno Museum, Moscow
- "Another Atmosphere", group exhibition, Bakulev Scientific Center of Cardiovascular Surgery, Moscow
- "Bakstein Collection", Vladey Gallery, Moscow Contemporary Art Center Winzavod, Moscow

== Curator's projects ==
=== 2010 ===
- "autopsya", alternative festival of young contemporary art festival "Stop! Where are you going?", Moscow
- "Plener", Zverev Center, Moscow

=== 2013 ===
- "Uchronia" – in collaboration with Nedda Al-Madani, Shchusev Museum of Architecture, special project of 5th Moscow Biennale

=== 2014 ===
- "Art Marathon" in collaboration with Gallery 21, Contemporary Art Center Sokol, Moscow.
- "Touch and Tap TV" Boryana Rossa performance, Moscow State Solyanka Gallery, Moscow.

=== 2016 ===
- "Reflection" made in collaboration with Ksenia Podoynitsyna, Museum of Moscow

== Lectures and master classes ==
=== 2013 ===
- "Art in advertising", Red Apple Advertising Festival

=== 2018 ===
- "Integration of Art and Architecture", Peresvetov Lane Gallery
- "How to hunt for contemporary art with bare hands", Moscow Institute of Physics and Technology

=== 2019 ===
- "Color and shadow" master class made for a charity project "Another Atmosphere", Bakulev Scientific Center of Cardiovascular Surgery, Moscow
- "Alive blots" master class made for "Dachnoe Tsaritsyno" Festival, at Tsaritsyno Museum, Moscow
