= Victor Skersis =

- Виктор Скерсис
- Born: July 5, 1956 (age 69); Moscow, Soviet Union

Victor Skersis (Russian: Виктор Анта́насович Скерсис, born July 5, 1956, Moscow) is a Moscow conceptualist, artist, and theoretician.

== Life and work ==
Skersis studied at the Moscow State Polygraphic Institute (1973-1977). The institute forced him to withdraw two weeks before he was to graduate. His areas of interest include analytical conceptualism and metaconceptualism.

As an active member of the Moscow art scene since 1975, Skersis works independently, and collaborated with other artists. He was a member of "The Nest" (with Gennady Donskoi and Mikhail Roshal'), 1975–79, "SZ" (with Vadim Zakharov), 1980–84, 1989–90, "Cupid" (with Yuri Albert and Andrei Filippov), "Edelweiss" and “Tsar of the Hill” (Yuri Albert, Paruir Davtyan, and Andrei Filippov), and others.

A participant of numerous unofficial art shows in the Soviet Union in the 1970s and 1980s, including the 1975 nonconformist art show in the Culture Pavilion at VDNKh, Moscow; the 1977 Venice Biennale "La nuova arte Sovietica"; exhibits at APTART gallery, Moscow 1982-84; “The Other Art. Moscow 1956-1976,” The Tret'yakov State Gallery, Moscow and The State Russian Museum, Leningrad 1990-1991; “40 years of nonconformist art,” The Central Exhibition Hall Manezh Moscow 2002; “Sots-Art. Political art in Russia,” Maison Rouge, Paris, France, The Tret'yakov State Gallery, Moscow, 2007-2008; “Kollektsiia,” Pompidou Centre, 2016; “Thinking Pictures: Moscow Conceptual Art,” Zimmerli Art Museum, New Brunswick, 2016.

Victor Skersis lives and works in Moscow and the U.S., where he is engaged in fundamental research into the processes of art.

From 1975 to 1979 he was a member of The Nest, together with Gennady Donskoy and Mikhail Roshal.

== Exhibitions ==
1975

- The Nest, House of Culture, VDNKh, Moscow

1977

- The Nest, Venice Biennale, "La nuova arte Sovietica"

=== 1983 ===
- 1st SZ exhibition (together with Vadim Zakharov).
- Apt-Art Gallery (Apartment of N. Alekseev), Moscow
- 2nd SZ exhibition (together with Vadim Zakharov). Apartment M. Roshal, Moscow
- 3rd SZ exhibition (together with Vadim Zakharov).
- House of Culture of the 2nd State Bearing Plant on Shabolovka St., Moscow
- 4th SZ exhibition (traveling, together with Vadim Zakharov). Apartments of N. Alekseev, I. Chuikov, D. Prigov, A. Yulikov, L. Bazhanov, G. Kizevalter, Moscow

=== 1989 ===
- 5th solo exhibition "SZ". Organized during the exhibition Muveszet helyet Muveszet, Mucsarnok, Budapest, Hungary

=== 1990 ===
- Bruder Karamazoff (together with Vadim Zakharov). Sophia Ungers Gallery, Cologne, Germany

=== 2004 ===
- Group SZ (together with Vadim Zakharov). E.K. Art Bureau, Moscow

=== 2008 ===
- The Nest Group. National Center for Contemporary Art, Moscow
- Aspects of meta-art. Project "Factory", Moscow

=== 2009 ===
- Fragma, pragma and enigma (together with Yuri Albert and Andrei Filippov). Project "Factory", Moscow
- Show and Tell. The artist and his model (together with Yuri Albert and Andrei Filippov). Stella Art Foundation, Moscow

=== 2018 ===
"Owls are not what they seem" joint exhibition together with Tatyana Sherstyuk, Gallery 21, Moscow Contemporary Art Center Winzavod, Moscow

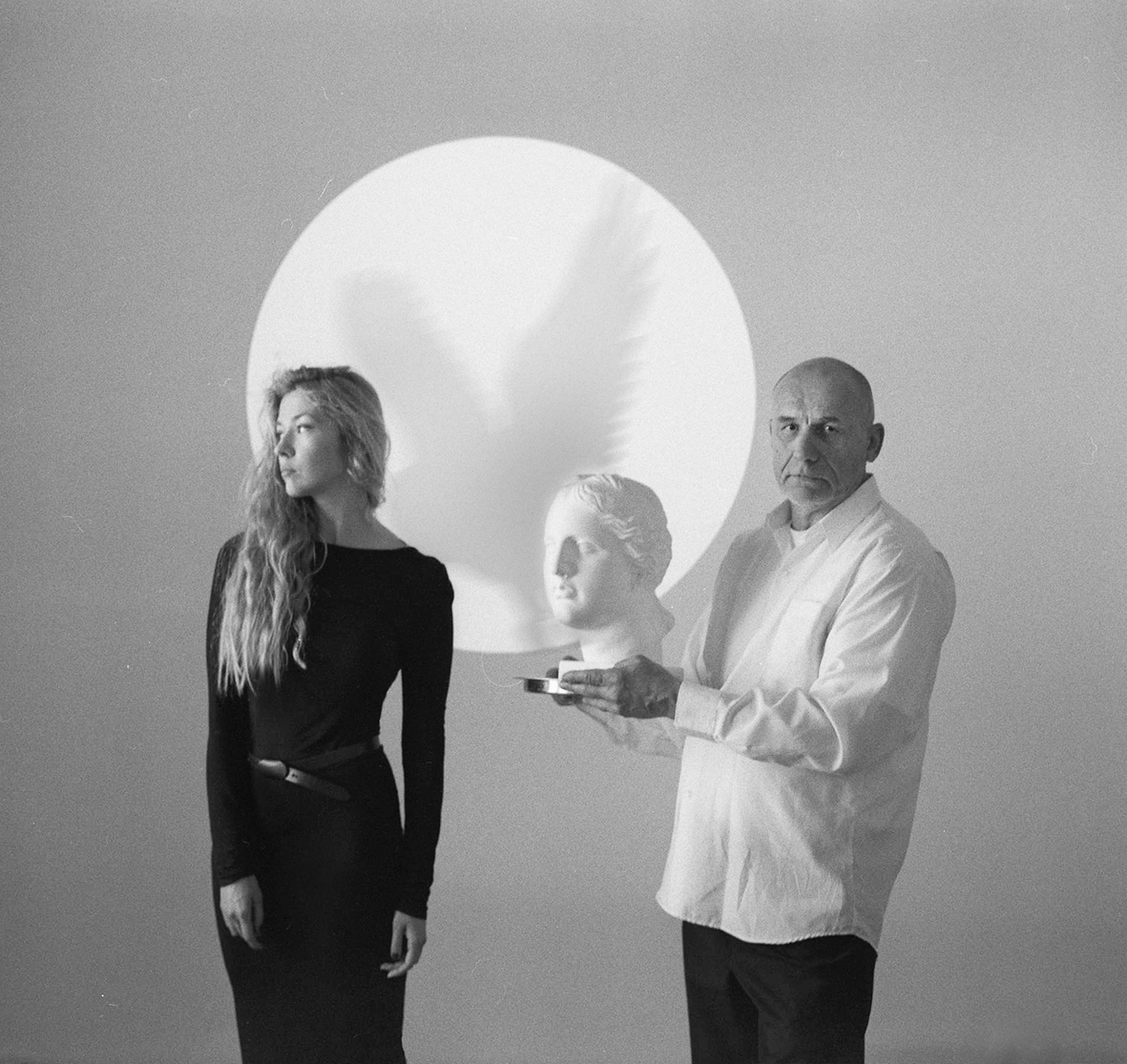

Nike is losing her head at the date with a snowman. Venus is exchanging her shadow with Apollo where the shadow turns into a rabbit, and after into a duck…These narratives are rhythmed and turn into a poetry of a size of a gallery. They fly of like a refrain by the exhibition of two artists of different generations – a legendary Victor Skersis from art team "Nest" and a young inheritor of "Analytical conceptualism": Tatyana Sherstyuk. A poem written by with spectacular illusions is named "Owls are not what they seem". Maria Moskvicheva (a journalist, an historian, a culturologist, an art columnist of Moskovky Kmsololets Newspaper, a member of Association of Art Critics (AIS).
