= Michael Liani =

Israeli photographer (born 1987)

- מיכאל ליאני
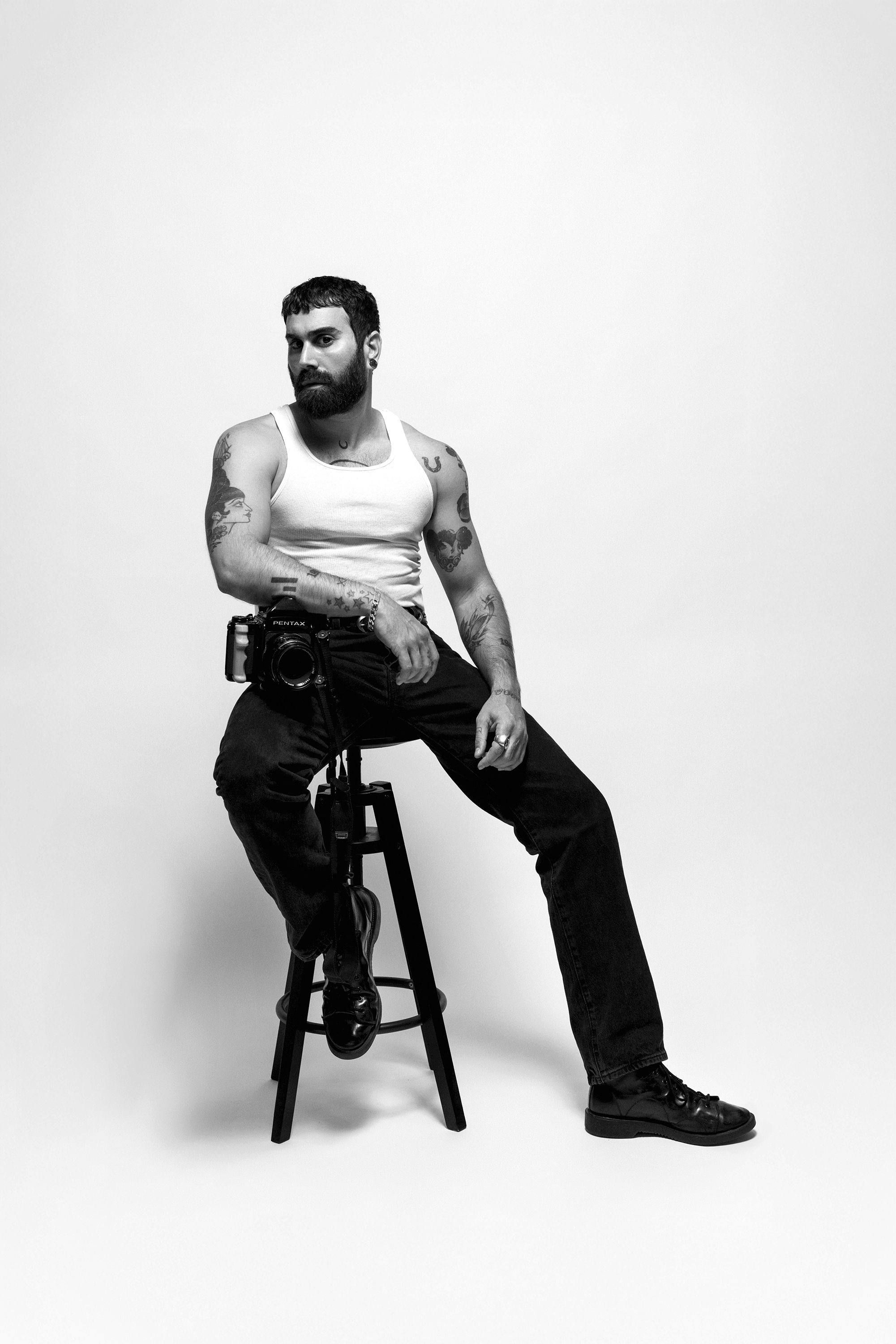
- Born: 1987 (age 38–39); Migdal HaEmek, Israel
- Education: Bezalel Academy of Arts and Design, Open University of Israel, Minshar
- Known for: Photography, video art

Michael Liani (Hebrew: מיכאל ליאני; born 1987) is an Israeli artist, photographer, video artist and editor, and art lecturer who lives and works in Tel Aviv. He has won several awards, including two from Israel's Ministry of Culture and Sports, Docaviv festival and the International Photography Contest at Paris College of Art. His creations have been displayed in dozens of museums and galleries.

== Early life and education ==
Michael Liani was born in Migdal Ha’emek, Israel to a family that immigrated from Morocco.

He studied art and photography at Minshar school of arts in Tel-Aviv and graduated (with honors) in 2014. He completed his B.A. in 2015, majoring in humanities and social sciences and continued his studies at Bezalel Academy of Arts and Design, where he received his MFA degree in 2016, with high honors. In 2022 he completed studying phototherapy at The Open University, Tel Aviv.

== Artistic career ==
His work explores the tension between center and periphery, tradition and modernity, and aspects of gender and aesthetics in human communication.

His work was featured on several solo exhibitions, including "HA'CK" at Kav 16 Gallery, Tel Aviv; BUSTAN AL HUB (with Yuval Atzili) at IDRIS gallery, Tel Aviv; "Fantasia" at Rosenfeld Gallery, Tel Aviv; S' emek at Afula’s municipal art gallery and " All Inclusive" at Herzliya Museum of Contemporary Art.

Liani also participated in Moscow International Biennale for Young Art and in Eye Spy: The New Wight Biennial at the department of art in UCLA. His works were also presented in more than 20 group exhibitions, including zwischen körpern, Kleine Humboldt Galerie, Berlin in 2021; Art Rooms Roma, video room, Rome in 2018; "HSHUMA", Artist House, Tel Aviv in 2018; "ZOOM" Young Israeli Artists, The Israel Museum – Ticho House, Jerusalem in 2016 and "reGeneration3" itinerant exhibition, Musée de l'Elysée, Geneva in 2015.

Along his artistic career, Liani is also a video art teacher at Thelma Yellin High School and a lecturer in photography at Minshar school of Arts.

== Honors and awards ==
In 2021 Liani received the Minister of Culture and Sports awards for the preservation and cultivation of Israeli cultures in the name of Yitzhak Navon and the Ostrovsky family fund award at video art and experimental film competition in Jerusalem Film Festival.

Liani was also the recipient of the NEXT! Prize for Innovative Creation of the Docaviv International Documentary Film Festival in 2019; the Prize for Emerging Artist granted by the Ministry of Culture, Israel in 2018; Winner of International Photography Contest, Paris College of Art and the Li Zhou Photography Festival Prize at Li Zhou Museum for Photography, China, in 2017.

== Personal life ==
Liani moved to Tel Aviv at the age of 18, and has lived there since.

== Gallery ==
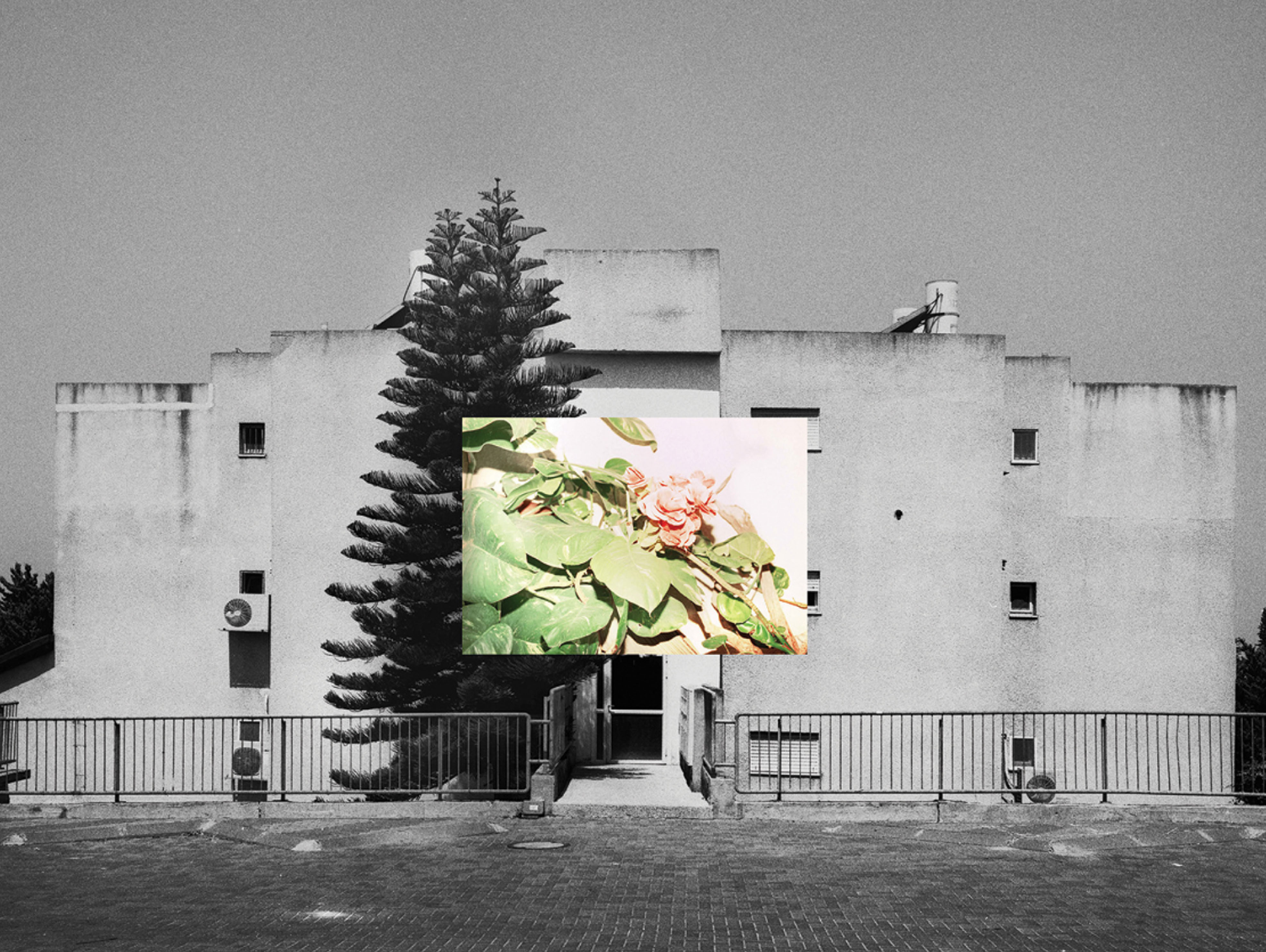

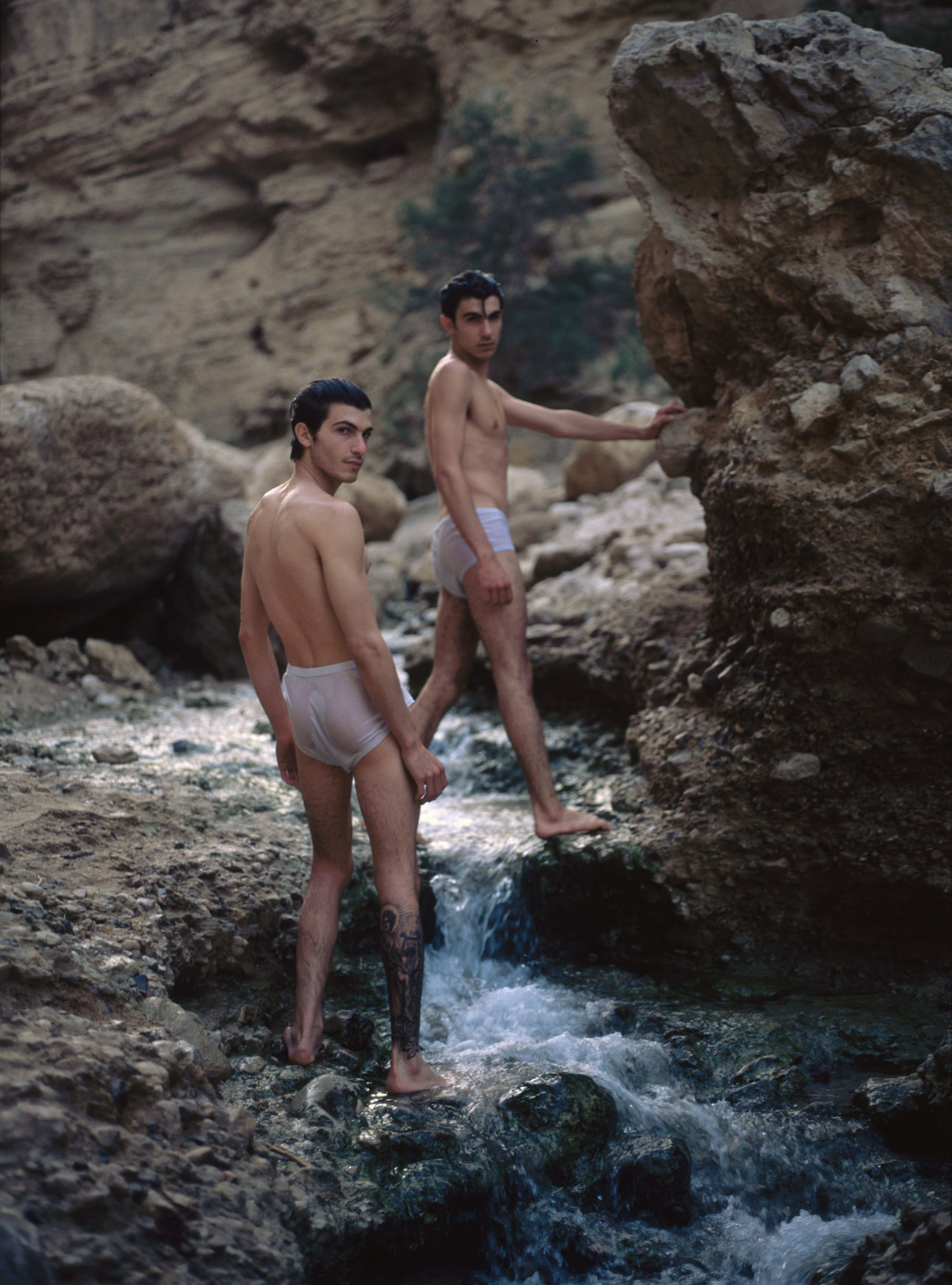

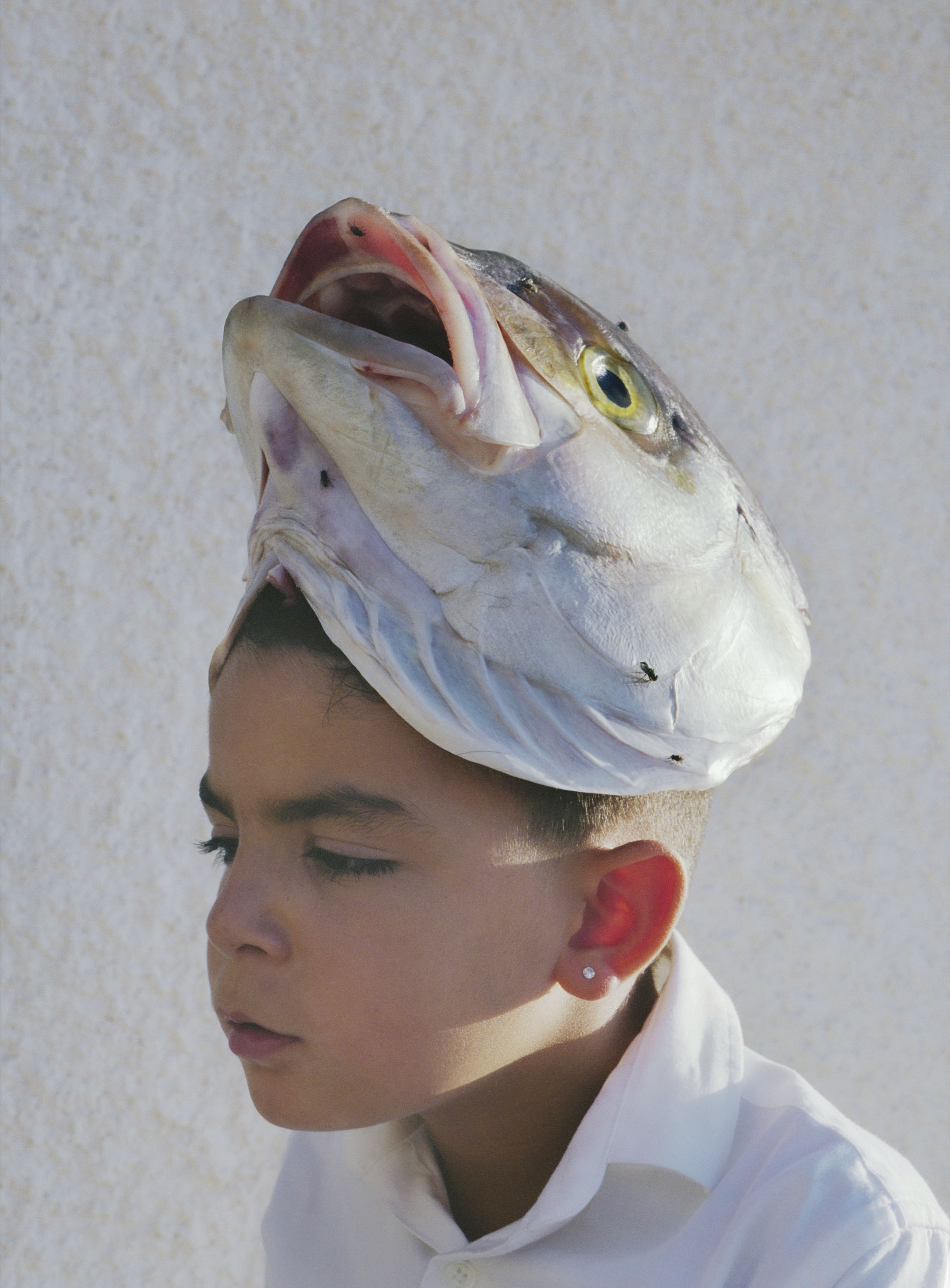

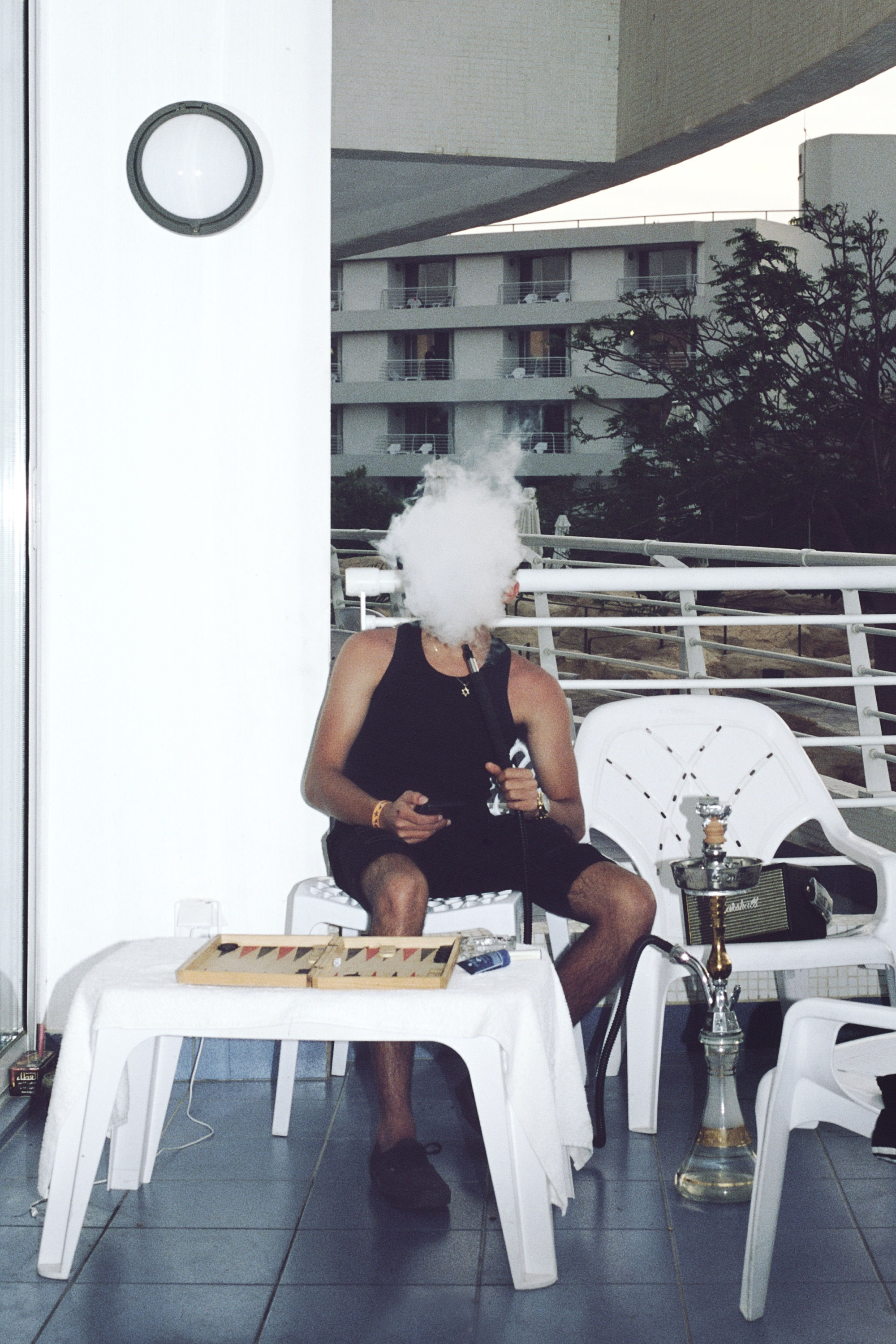

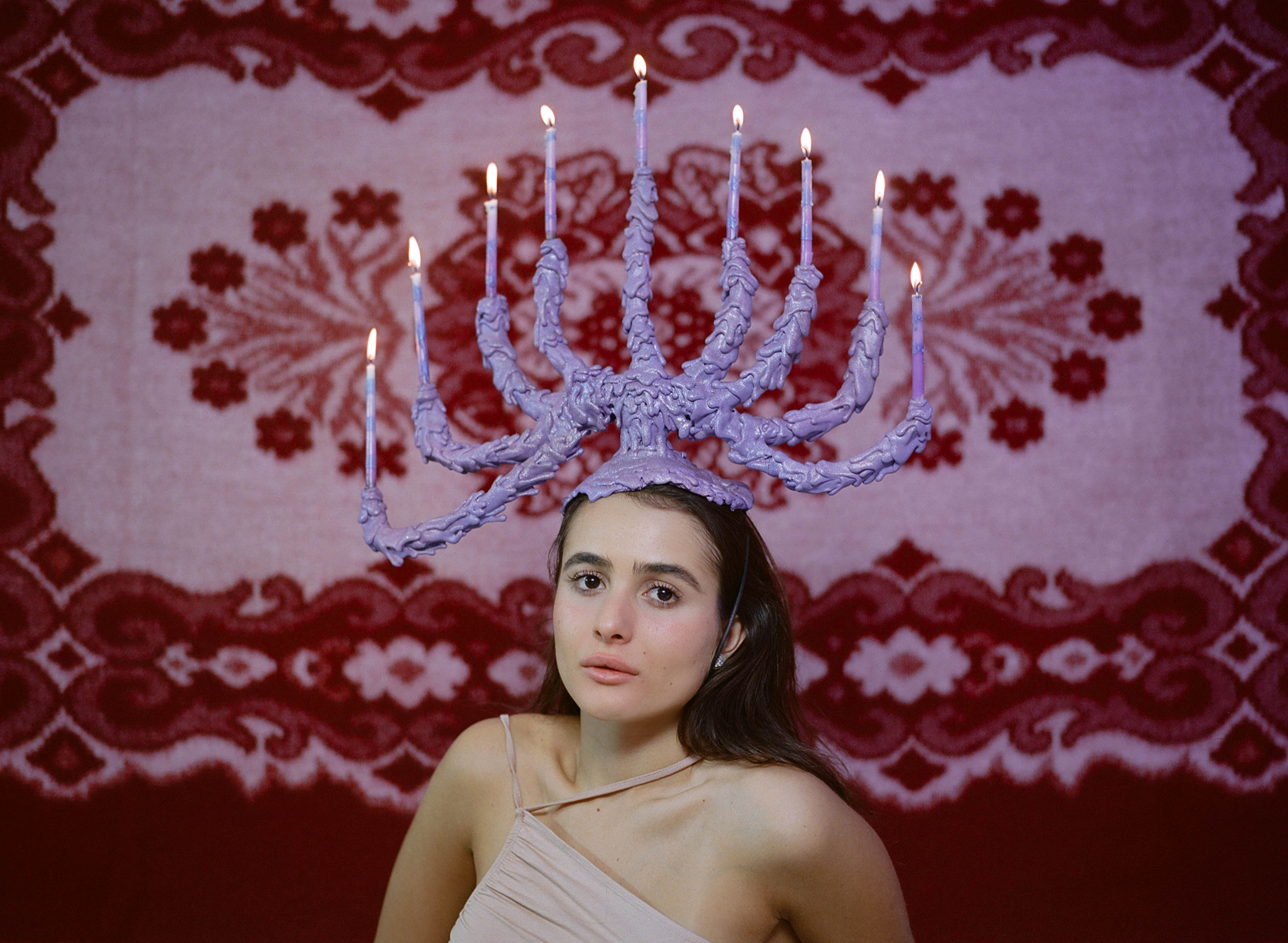
