= Noize MC =

Russian rapper (born 1985)

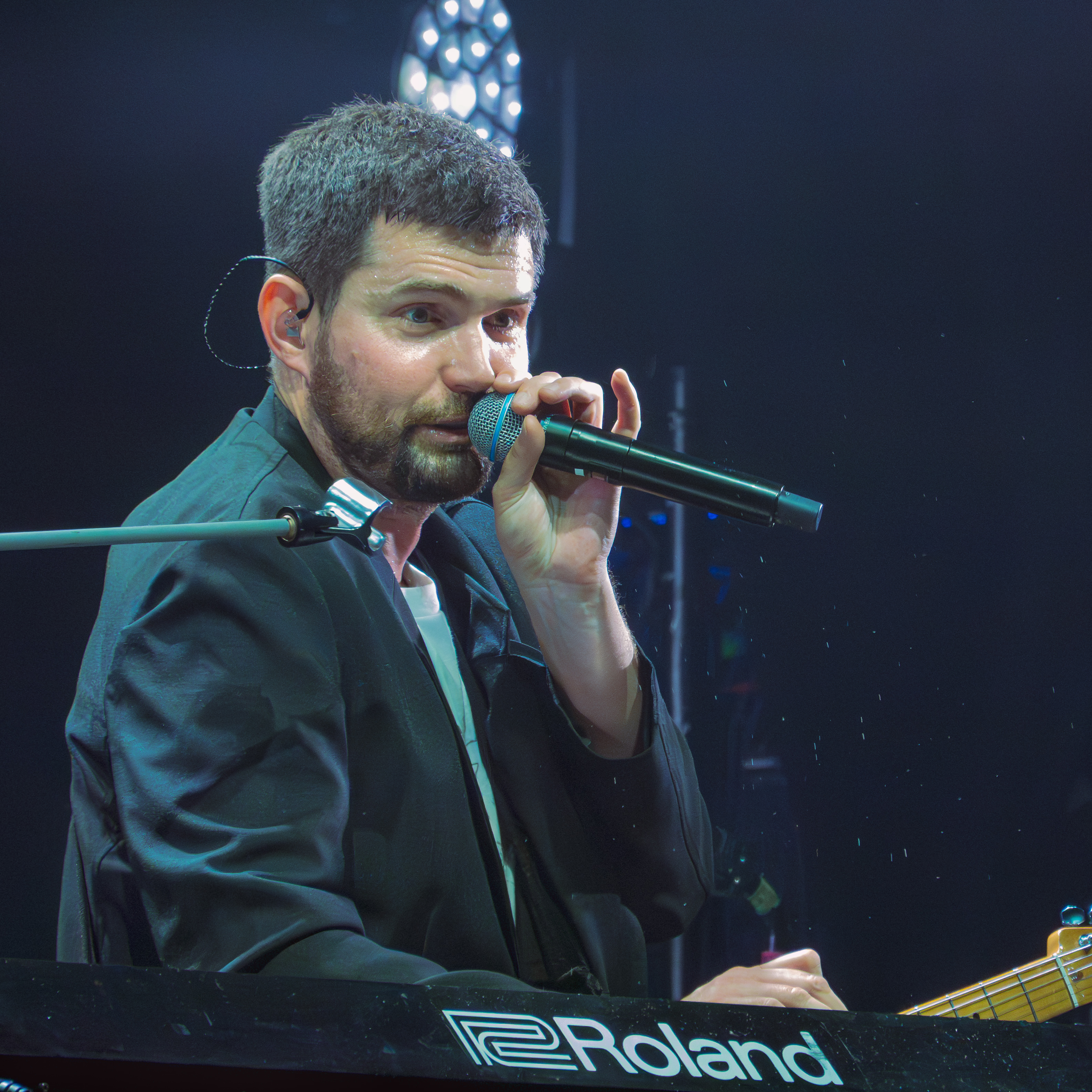
- Noize MC in 2025

Background information
- Born: 9 March 1985 (age 41); Yartsevo, Smolensk Oblast, Russian SFSR, Soviet Union
- Genres: Alternative hip hop; rap rock; alternative rock; conscious hip hop
- Occupations: Rapper; singer; songwriter; guitarist; actor
- Instruments: Vocals; guitar; keyboards
- Years active: 1997–present
- Labels: Universam Kul'tury; Respect Production; M2
- Website: noizemc.com

Ivan Aleksandrovich Alekseyev (Russian: Иван Александрович Алексеев; born 9 March 1985), known professionally as Noize MC, is a Russian rapper, singer, and actor.

== Biography ==
=== Childhood, early work (1985–2002) ===
Alekseyev was born on 9 March 1985 in Yartsevo, Smolensk Oblast. His father is a musician and his mother is a chemist. His parents divorced in 1994. When he was about eight or nine years old, Alekseyev first began to write poetry, and at the age of ten became interested in music. In the winter of 1995–96 he enrolled in music school, studying classical guitar. In 1997 he moved with his mother to the city of Belgorod, where he twice won the regional competition for classical guitar: 1st place in 1998 and 2nd in 2000. When Alekseyev was 13 he formed his own rock band. His idols were Nirvana and The Prodigy. In 2001 Alekseyev graduated music school and in 2002 he graduated high school with a "gold medal". That summer, the musician went to the Russian State University for the Humanities, and therefore had to leave his band and move to Moscow.

=== Formation of Protivo Gunz (2003–2006) ===
Settled in an RSHU dormitory, Ivan started his solo career. In 2003, he organized the alternative rock band "Protivo Gunz", composed of non-resident students. It was in his dormitory period that he perfected his mastery of the hip-hop freestyle, and composed most of his demos as Noize MC. The tracks became popular among young people, thanks to the Internet.

From 2003 to 2005 Noize MC participated in various freestyle battles, and other clubs and network hip-hop competition. He regularly won prizes in battles, and the group "Protivo Gunz" toured Moscow and performed in clubs, bars, and outdoor areas.

In March 2005, Noize MC won against the famous rapper Young MC, in the final freestyle Battle at the festival of street culture "Snickers Guru Clan." Noize MC was invited by the organizers to become a judge and presenter at another large street festival, called "Snickers Urbania".

In May of this year, Ivan Alekseyev moved out of the dormitory into a rented room on the street Old Arbat. The band "Protivo Gunz" regularly appeared in impromptu street concerts. Some concerts were interrupted by police.

In the summer of 2005 and 2006, Noize MC went with "Snickers Urbania" on Russia. With the money, the studio recorded songs that were released in various rap compilations. In summer 2006, Noize MC signed to "Respect Productions" as a solo artist, but continued to sing with the band "Protivo Gunz". On 9 September 2006 his rock band won the Russian competition "Urban Sound".

=== Rise in popularity (2007–2008) ===
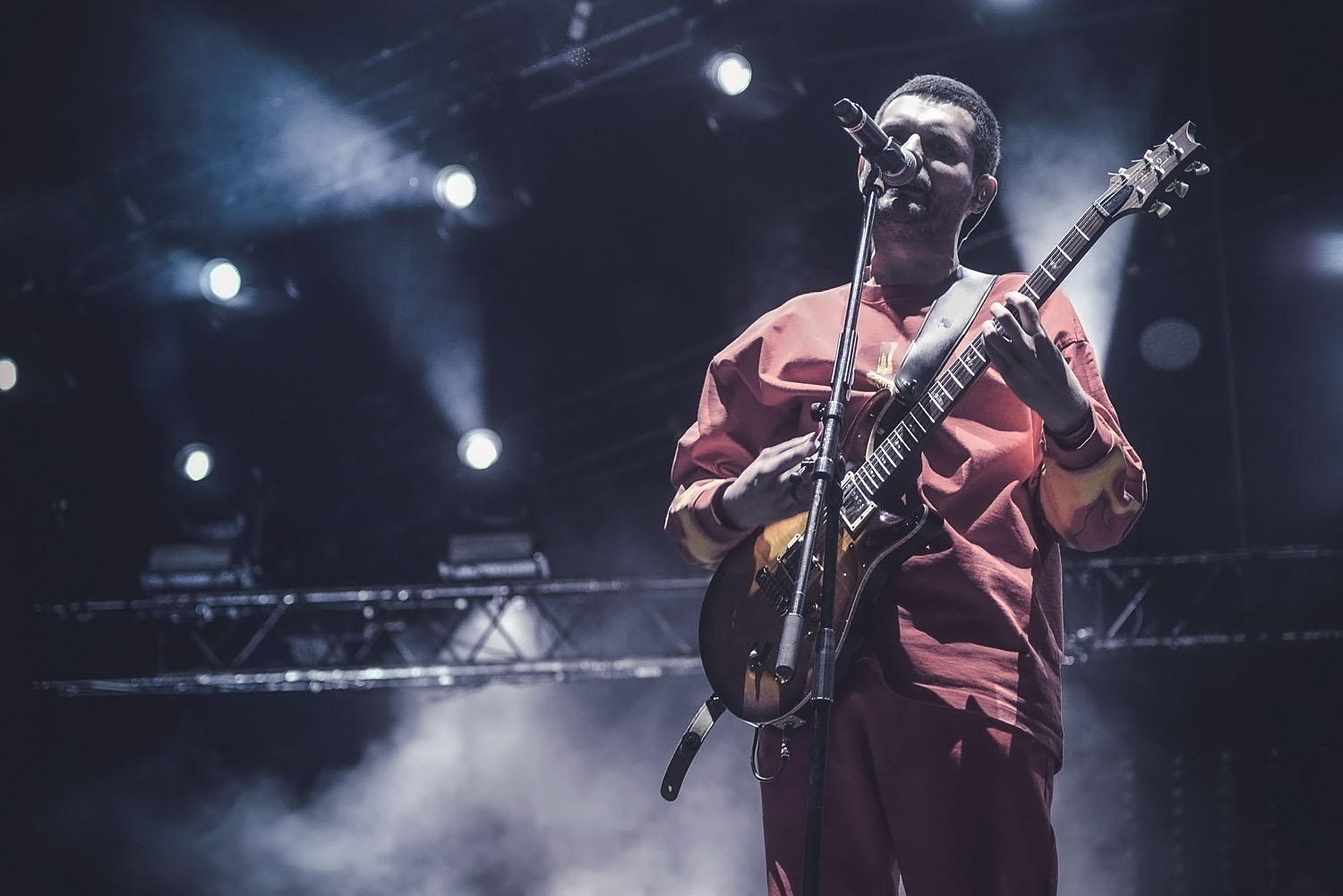
Noize MC performing in Saint Petersburg in 2020

As the grand prize for winning "Urban Sound", Protivo Gunz was filmed in a low-budget video for "Pesnya dlya radioefira" (an old song from the solo repertoire of Ivan Alekseyev), which was shown on the TV channel "Muz-TV". At the insistence of the label, the artist was specified as Noize MC in the final output. In November 2006, the track appeared on the radio station "DFM". In March 2007, Muz-TV showed retakes from the making of the music video. The Estonian music video was directed by Hindrek Maasik.

13 April 2007 a contract was signed between Noize MC and Respect Productions, and the Russian subsidiary of Universal Music Group. Music journalists regarded the signing of the contract as a significant event not only for the artist, but for Russian hip-hop as well. "This event is not easy to overestimate," said analyst portal Rap.ru. "We have seen an underground artist become an artist with an international label name." There was originally a plan to release a Noize MC debut album jointly with Respect Production and Universal Music Russia, but several months later the previous label artist completely handed over rights to Universal Music Group.

At the same time, Noize MC won the largest Russian Internet competition – "7th official hip-hop battles portal Hip-Hop.Ru", which took place from October 2006 to April 2007. He participated in battles with over 3,000 Russian rappers from around the world. A video of one battle "Za Zakrytoj dver'u" went public in September 2007. The director was again Hindrek Maasik. In the autumn, Noize MC's work was widely broadcast on radio stations and music channels, taking 10th place of "100 Best Songs MTV-2007."

In the summer of 2007, Ivan Alekseyev starred in a leading role in the project production center Pavel Lungin – the movie "Rozygrysh", a remake of the 1976 popular picture of Vladimir Menshov. Ivan played Igor Glushko, a senior in high school and young musician, who moved to Moscow from the Tyumen region after the death of his parents. Noize MC also composed the soundtrack to the film. The premiere took place on 22 May 2008. A music video for the song "Moyo More" was filmed based on the movie, and is being shown on the channel A-ONE.

=== Exit to City (2021) ===
On 19 November 2021, Ivan released his ninth studio album titled Exit to City. The cover art was created by the contemporary artist Dima Rebus, known for his work with watercolor, rainwater, and chemical solutions. On this day, the first half of the tracks was published, with the full version of the album becoming available on 17 December.

== Political activity ==
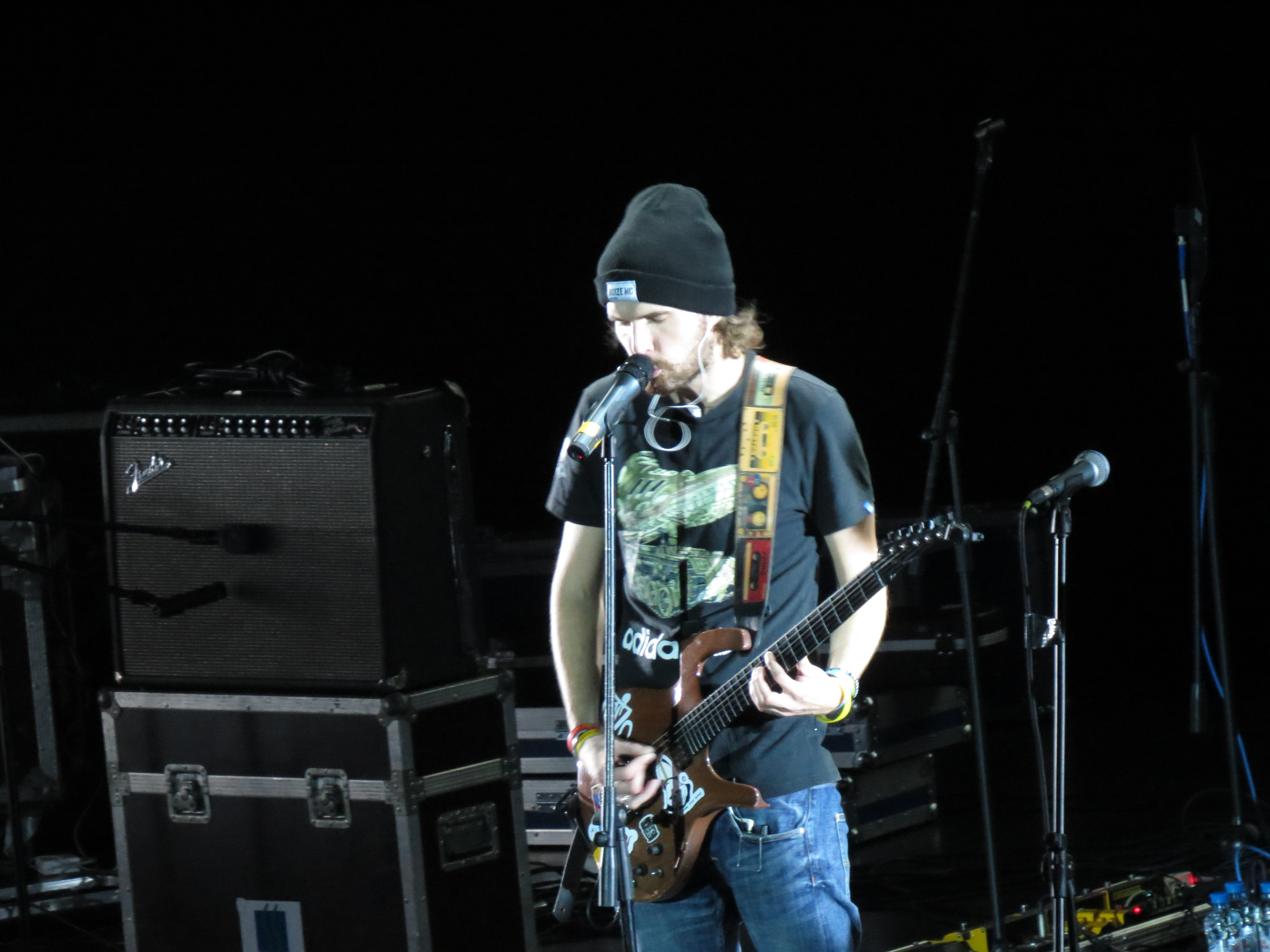
Noize MC during #Rokuznik (Rock prisoner) concert in support of prisoners of the Bolotnaya Square case in Moscow on 22 September 2013

In February 2010, the car of the Lukoil Vice President Anatoly Barkov collided with a Citroën on the Leninsky Avenue near the Gagarin Square in Moscow. As a result, two women in the Citroën, one of whom was pregnant, were killed. Witnesses claimed that Barkov had been in the wrong lane avoiding traffic, but authorities blamed the Citroën. Noize MC was in Vladivostok at the time, on a tour. One of the women in the Citroën was the sister of his friend. Within 24 hours he wrote the rap piece "Mercedes S666" in protest of Barkov's impunity. This song, and its animated music video, became very popular on the internet. (This reaction can be seen as part of a larger social movement against oligarchs' impunity in traffic violations.)

Noize MC, along with other celebrities such as writer Boris Akunin addressed the crowds at an anti-government demonstration on 10 December 2011.

In August 2014, Noize MC performed in Ukraine during the Russian intervention and partial occupation of Ukraine. (Note: Russia has denied supporting the pro-Russian militia forces of the 2014 insurgency in Donbass; but on 17 April 2014, Russian president Vladimir Putin admitted that Russian troops were active in Crimea during the March 2014 Crimean referendum that asked if Crimeans wanted to secede from Ukraine to join Russia, claiming this facilitated self-determination for the peninsula.) During a festival in Lviv, he had a Ukrainian flag on stage and dedicated his performance to "all the victims of information warfare". Upon his return to Russia, more than 60% of his upcoming shows were subsequently cancelled by concert promoters following pressure from local authorities, while a number of the remaining were disrupted by unexpected police drug raids and fake bomb searches; the band also had trouble rescheduling events or finding alternative venues. Speaking to the BBC in November 2014, he said that his group was being "blacklisted" in Russia and added that they were "[being] watched and monitored everywhere. It's pretty creepy. I'm really against war. And now this kind of position is considered dangerous."

In March 2022, one month after the start of the Russian invasion of Ukraine, Noize MC performed in Berlin at the Sound of Peace Event at the Brandenburg Gate, a solidarity alliance of cultural workers and prominent people. Also in 2022 he moved with his family from Russia to Lithuania. In May 2024, he and a number of other Russian artists released a song in the memory of Russian opposition leader Alexei Navalny.

In 2024, Noize MC participated in the Russian New Year's television show Mirnye Ogon'ki (Peaceful Lights), which was created as an alternative to similar shows on state-controlled and militarized Russian television.

== Band members ==
Current members

- Ivan Alekseyev – lead vocals, guitar (2003–present)
- Alexander Kislinskiy – bass guitar, backing vocals (2003–present)
- Ashot Petrosyan – scratching, sampling, beatboxing, backing vocals, tambourine (2013–present)
- Vladimir Zinovyev – drums (2017–present)

Current touring musicians

- Andrey Shinkevich – guitar (2013–present)

Former members

- Andrey Pikh – drums (2003–2005)
- Stanislav Ammosov – scratching, sampling (2012–2013)
- Pavel Teterin – guitar (2004–2005), drums (2005–2014)
- Mikhail Kozodayev – drums (2014–2017)
- Maxim Kramar – guitar, keyboard, backing vocals (2005–2017)

Former touring musicians

- Oleg Kudryavtsev – saxophone (2013)
- Yaroslav Danilin – trombone (2013)
- Alexey Alexeyev – trumpet (2013)
- Irina Lvova – cello (2013)
- Vladislav Oskolkov – violin (2013)
- Sergey Skvortsov – guitar (2011–2013)
- Grigoriy Karpov – drums (2017)

Timeline

== Discography ==
=== Albums ===
- 2008 – The Greatest Hits Vol. 1
- 2010 – The Greatest Hits Vol. 2
- 2010 – Latest Album (Последний Альбом)
- 2012 – New Album (Новый Альбом)
- 2013 – Protivo Gunz
- 2013 – Confusion (Неразбериха)
- 2014 – Hard Reboot
- 2015 – Hard Reboot 3.0
- 2016 – King of the Mountain (Царь Горы)
- 2018 – Hiphopera: Orpheus & Eurydice (Хипхопера: Орфей & Эвридика)
- 2021 – Exit to City (Выход в город)
- 2025 – Not Everybody's Home (Не все дома)

=== Singles ===
- 2013 – "Bubble Gum" (video edit) (Жвачка (video edit))
- 2015 – "Tearing the Leash" (Порвав поводок)
- 2015 – "Make Some Noize"
- 2015 – "Jingle Bellz"
- 2016 – "Lenin Has Risen"
- 2017 – "Childfree" (Чайлдфри)
- 2017 – "Summer in the Capital" (featuring SunSay & MC Fame) (Лето в столице)
- 2017 – "Corrosion of the Hip-hop" (Коррозия Хип-Хопа)
- 2018 – "Voice and Strings" (Голос и струны)
- 2019 – "Like Common People" (Всё как у людей)
- 2019 – "Chasing the Horizon" (featuring Sonny Sandoval)
- 2019 – "Respect the Elderly" (Почитай старших)
- 2022 – "Cooperative Swan Lake" (Кооператив Лебединое озеро)
- 2025 - "Pieces of feelings" (Обломки чувств)
- 2026 - "Sleeping Beauty" (Спящая Красавица)
