= Dima Rebus =

Contemporary artist based in London

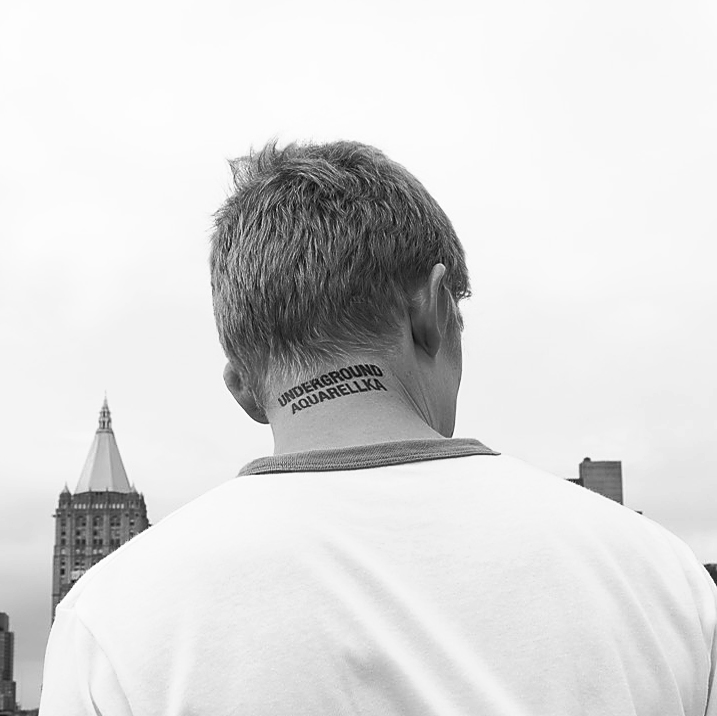
- Born: 1988 (age 37–38); Naberezhnye Chelny
- Website: dimarebus.com

Dima Rebus (born 1988) is a contemporary artist who lives and works in London. He works primarily in large-scale watercolour, using water as an artistic material in its own right. His work centres on interaction with place and unfolding events, and on how that interaction is refracted through individual experience.

His work involves strangers around the world who collect and provide him with water samples from different geographical locations.

== Early life and career ==
Rebus was born in 1988 in Naberezhnye Chelny. He studied at the Moscow Institute of Art and Industry and the Institute of Contemporary Art (ICA Moscow). Alongside his studies, he worked in editorial illustration for international media including Esquire and National Geographic.

In 2014, Rebus took part in Casus Pacis, part of the parallel programme of the European biennial Manifesta 10. The project brought together Russian and Ukrainian artists around themes of war and peace and called for peace against the backdrop of the events of 2014 in Ukraine. That same year, he presented an independent project in the parallel programme of the 4th International Biennale for Young Art at the A. N. Scriabin Memorial Museum, and later held his first solo exhibition abroad, in Brussels. In 2016, his site-specific project Good Deal was included in the parallel programme of the 5th International Biennale for Young Art. In the following years, his works were shown at the Multimedia Art Museum, and in 2019 he took part in the Urban Nation Biennale in Berlin.

Rebus later developed the Floaters series, which formed the basis of his 2025 solo exhibition at Frieze No.9 Cork Street in London.

== Work ==
Rebus's work combines figuration and abstraction, the documentary and the fictional. Through images, events and phenomena, he considers how place and circumstance shape individual perception. This is reflected in the spaces he depicts, where psychological experience can take precedence over physical location.

Rebus builds an archive of water samples collected for him by strangers in different parts of the world, whom he calls floaters. The samples are handed to him in person, sent to him, or left at prearranged locations. Each sample is documented with its location, date, origin and pH level. Before use, the water is filtered and then combined with pigments and his own chemical solutions. In some works, the water is first frozen and then left to melt directly onto the paper, allowing its physical properties to help shape the image. Part of the process remains beyond his full control. The participants become indirect co-authors: through the water, the geography of each sample, the circumstances of its collection and the human interaction involved become part of the work. That interaction then finds symbolic form in phantom-like images of people, animals and objects.
