= Cooperative Swan Lake =

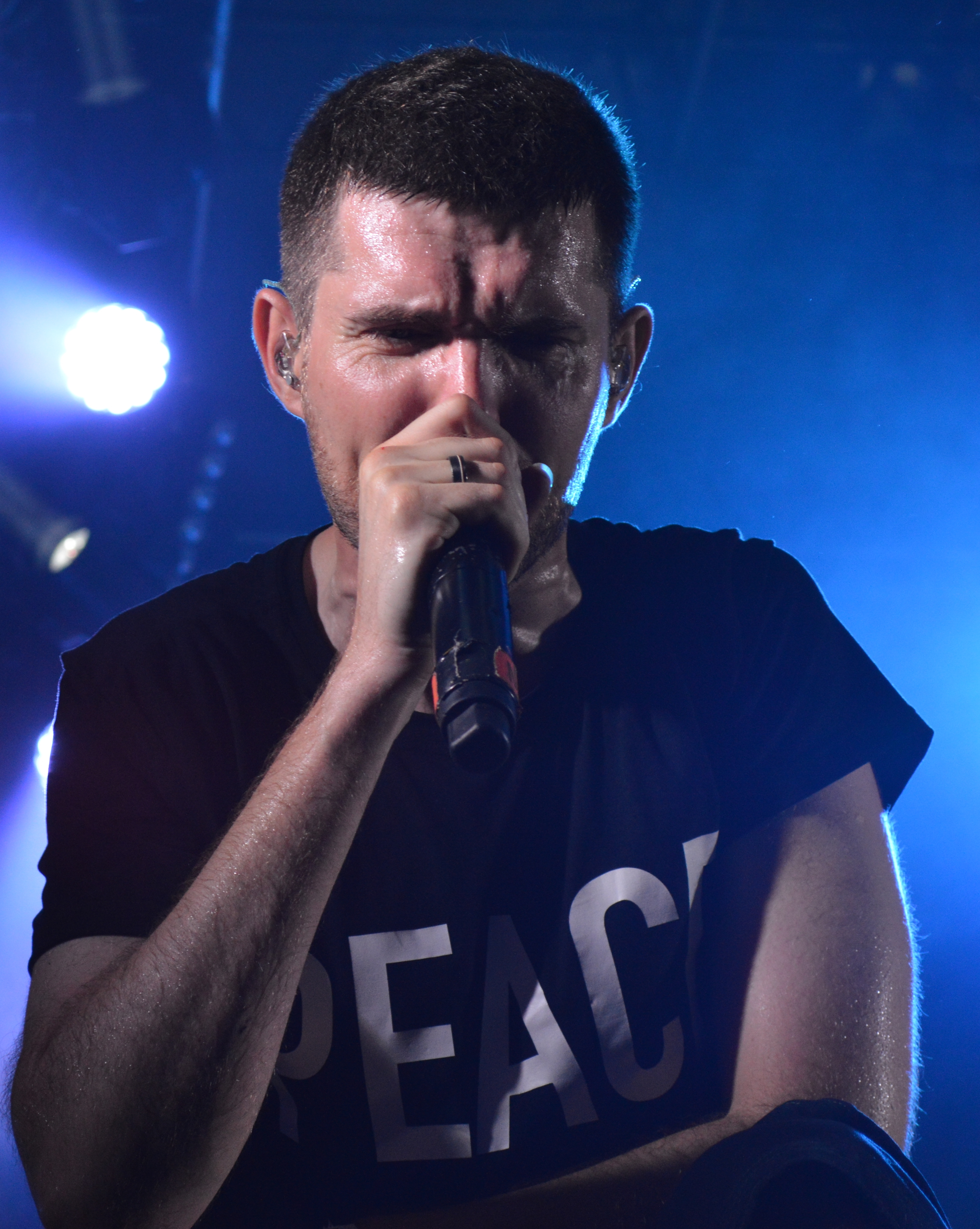

Single by Noize MC
- Released: 14 April 2023
- Recorded: 2022
- Genre: Hip-hop
- Length: 4:02
- Songwriters: Pyotr Ilyich Tchaikovsky, Ivan Alekseev
- Producers: Vadim Nekrasov, Ilya Loekasjev and Ivan Alekseev

Music video
- "Cooperative Swan Lake" on YouTube

"Cooperative Swan Lake" (Russian: "Кооператив «Лебединое озеро»") is a song written in 2022 by Russian rapper Noize MC (pseudonym of Ivan Aleksandrovich Alekseev). It is a satire on Russian President Vladimir Vladimirovich Putin and his entourage, and is full of references to everything that, according to the author, has gone wrong in the Russian Federation since Putin's rise to power.

The Primorsky District Court of Saint Petersburg banned the song in May 2025 because of its "extremist character"; it was considered "propaganda for the violent overthrow of the government" and "a threat to the moral and ethical development of Russian youth". Nevertheless, it has since become an unofficial anthem for the growing disillusionment and anger that young, liberal Russians feel toward Putin's regime.

Noize MC himself was already added to the register of persons considered a foreign agent by the Russian Ministry of Justice on November 18, 2022. Earlier that year, he had emigrated to Lithuania, where he organised a tour with singer Monetochka to raise money for the Ukrainian refugees.

On October 14, 2025, street singer Diana Loginova from the band Stoptime was arrested in Saint Petersburg due to her performing "Cooperative Swan Lake" at Vosstaniya Square two days earlier, where it was sung along loudly by hundreds of young people.

== Composition and lyrics ==
The melody of the song is taken from the allegro moderato of the Danse des petits cygnes, the famous pas de quatre from the second act of the ballet Swan Lake by composer Pyotr Ilyich Tchaikovsky. The ballet has special significance for many Russians, as it symbolises the collapse of the Soviet Union. During the 1991 Soviet coup attempt in Moscow, the ballet was broadcast continuously on national television channels instead of the news, thus ensuring the population's hunger for news about what was happening at the top of the country. During Noize MC's public performances, both the audience in the hall and the musicians on stage imitate the "pas de quatre" from the ballet.

The song's title is a double satire in itself. It refers not only to Tchaikovsky's ballet, but also to Putin's entourage and the nepotism that characterises Putin's policies. In the mid-1990s, eight men acquired large plots of land on the shores of Lake Komsomolskoye northwest of Saint Petersburg through a cooperative called Озеро (Ozero), or "The Lake". They built luxurious summer homes on this lucrative land and spent much of their time together. One of them was Vladimir Putin; the other seven, through Putin, became successful businessmen and government officials when he became president and remain part of his immediate entourage that governs the country.

The line "Where were you during those eight years?" refers to the period between 2014 and 2022, when Russia annexed Crimea and 30,000 Russian soldiers operated in the Donbas where, under the command of former FSB Colonel Igor Vsevolodovich Girkin, also known as Igor Strelkov, they shot down Malaysia Airlines Flight 17. At the time, Russian troops wore uniforms without insignia to give the impression that they were Russian-speaking Ukrainian opponents of the government in Kyiv. With these words, Noize MC condemns the apathy that Russian society showed for eight years towards the war in Ukraine and the annexation of Crimea, which the Kremlin then still denied.

The line "get those damn nightingales off the screen" refers to the war propaganda on daily talk shows on various Russian state channels. A nightingale is a соловей (solovyey) in Russian, which refers to Vladimir Rudolfovich Solovyov, the host of the television programme An Evening with Vladimir Solovyov on Russia-1. Solovyov is one of Putin's most brazen propagandists. In June 2017, he called participants in an anti-corruption demonstration in Moscow "the eternal two-percent shit". He also considered Adolf Hitler "a brave man compared to opposition leader Alexei Navalny". Solovyov has already called for the complete extermination of the population of Kharkiv, Nikolaev and Odesa. On January 12, 2023, on the social media platform Telegram, he encouraged the Kremlin to attack not only Ukraine, but other countries as well: "Any military target on French, Polish and British territory - we must declare it officially - is a legitimate target for us to attack".
