= Moscow Contemporary Art Center Vinzavod =

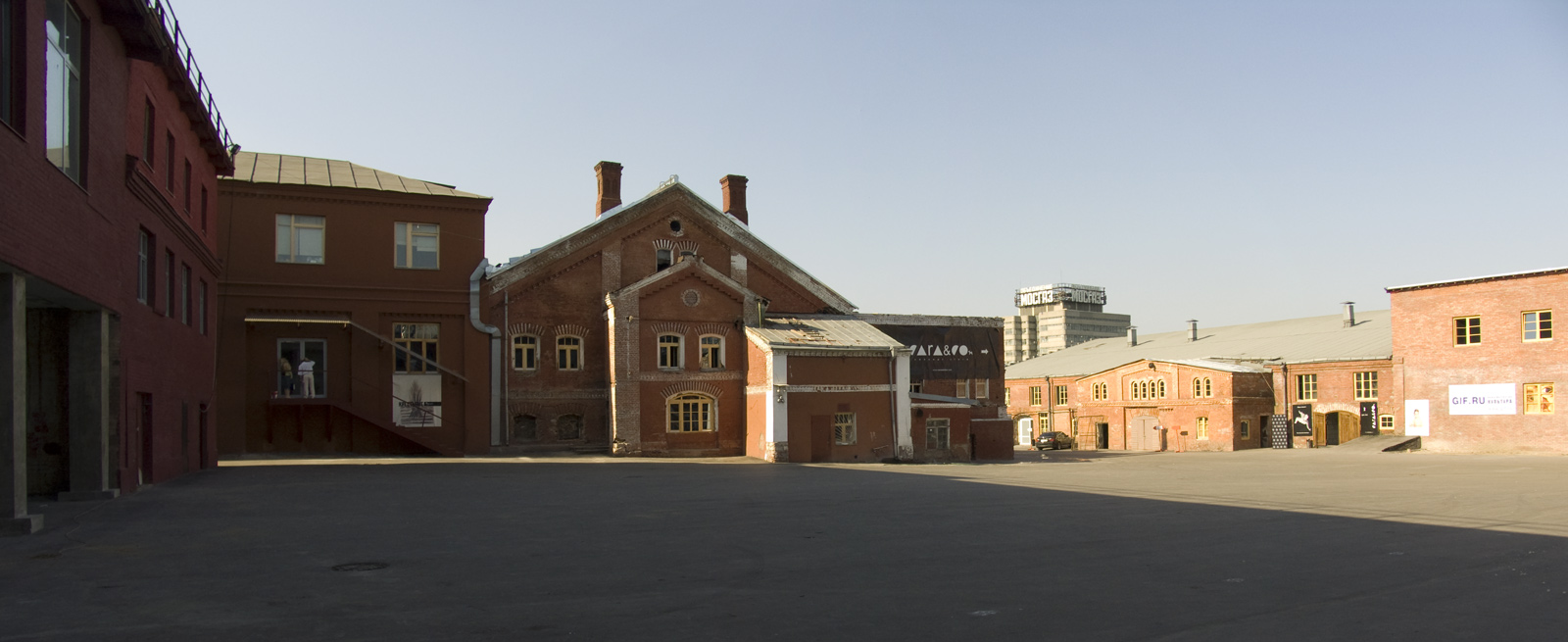
- Vinzavod Art Center

- Location within Moscow
- Established: 2007
- Location: Moscow
- Coordinates: 55°45′21″N 37°39′54″E
- Website: winzavod.ru/eng/

Vinzavod (Russian: Винзавод; Vinzavod, literally winery) is a centre for contemporary arts in Moscow, Russia. Opened in 2007, it is located in a complex of seven industrial buildings from the late 19th century including the former brewery (and later winery) called "Moscow Bavaria".

== History of the building ==
=== Estate of Princess Volkonskaya ===
Captain of the Guards regiment Melgunov, the first owner of an estate situated on the corner of modern Mruzovsky lane and 4th Syromyatnichesky lane, sold his estate to his own sister, Princess Catherine Volkonskaya.

In 1805, Monin bought the manor. After four years in 1810, Nicephorus Prokofiev opened a malt-brewing factory on its territory. In early 1821, the estate passed on to Revel shopkeeper Frederick Danielson of the 2nd Guild, who added a wing to the residential part of the building, along with a two-story brewery and malt house. Kokorev collected paintings and was a patron of the arts.

=== Moscow Bavaria ===
In the middle of the 19th century, the western part of the estate was cut off by the Moscow-Kursk railway. The malt building was on the corner of the newly paved lane and unexpectedly increased in urban value. The brewery kept all of its buildings. In the 1870s through the 1880s, brothers Ivan and Cyril Tarusin, the owners of “Moscow Bavaria” (Russian company for beer and mead in Moscow), acquired the factory. In 1909, part of the estate was acquired by legal representatives of H. S. Ledentsov, who used his resources for educational purposes; the main house was converted into a four-year college.

== History of the art center ==
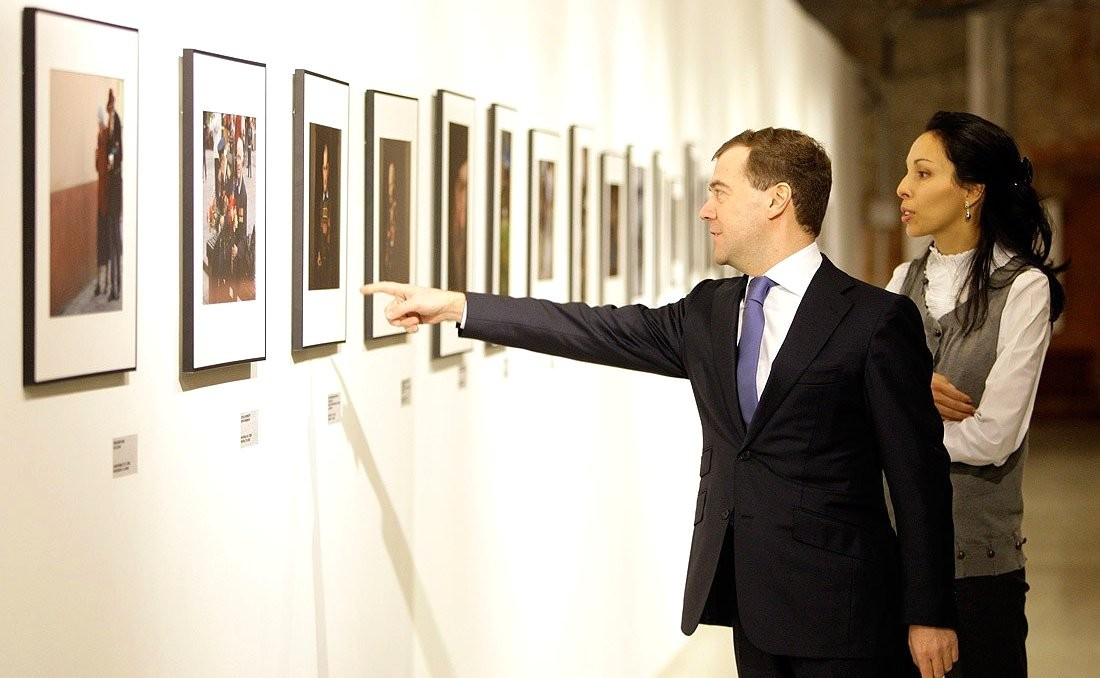
President of Russia Dmitri Medvedev visiting Vinzavod

Businessman Roman Trotsenko founded the Vinzavod Center for Contemporary Art. Lina Krasnyanskaya, who headed Vinzavod's flagship Best of Russia project, became the executive director in 2016.
