= Moscow International Biennale for Young Art =

The Moscow International Biennale for Young Art (MIBYA) is a major contemporary visual art exhibition that focuses on the work of artists and curators under the age of 35. It aims to bring together new artistic initiatives from Russia and the world by supporting the creative development of young artists for interested audiences. MIBYA was first held in 2008 in response to rising interest from artists, curators and critics following the festival of young art, "Qui Vive?" sponsored by the National Center for Contemporary Arts (NCCA) and held annually from 2002 to 2006, in collaboration with free workshops at the Moscow Museum of Modern Art (MMOMA). "The project has acquired new status thanks to growing interest from young artists, curators, and critics. Through the combined efforts of the NCCA and MMOMA, the biennial for young art was developed." Participants are given the chance to establish connections and connect with the professional artistic community.

== 6th Moscow International Biennial For Young Art ==
The 6th Moscow International Biennial for Young Art was from June 8 - August 10, 2018. The curator of the main project was Lucrezia Calabrò Visconti, an independent curator from Italy. The theme of the event was "Abracadabra" with an emphasis on "the night out" and the "dance floor". Abracadabra is an archaic magical incantation with opaque origins.

== 5th Moscow International Biennial For Young Art ==
The 5th Moscow International for Young Art was from July 10 - August 10, 2016. The theme of the event was "Deep Inside", the main exhibition was curated by Nadim Samman, an independent curator based in Berlin.

== 4th Moscow International Biennial For Young Art ==
The 4th Moscow International for Young Art was from June 26 - August 10, 2014. The theme of the event was "A Time for Dreams", the main exhibition was curated by David Elliott, an independent British curator. Other relevant exhibitions that were part of the programme included “HYPERCONNECTED” at the Moscow Museum of Modern Art (MMOMA), curated by Portuguese curator João Laia; and “Time of Reasonable Doubts,” curated by Italian curators Silvia Franceschini and Valeria Mancinelli.

== 3rd Moscow International Biennial For Young Art ==
The 3rd Moscow International for Young Art was from July 11 - August 10, 2012. The theme of the event was "Under a Tinsel Sun", the main exhibition was curated by Kathrin Becker, an independent Berlin-based curator. More than 100 artists and art groups from Russia and 33 countries (from Japan to Mexico and Canada) participated in the main exhibition of this edition.

== 2nd Moscow International Biennial For Young Art ==
The 2nd Moscow International for Young Art was from July 6 - August 1, 2010. The theme of the event was "Borders", the main exhibition was curated by Russian curators Daria Pyrkina and Daria Kamyshnikova. Other strategic exhibitions that were part of the programme included "Basic Forms" at Stella Art Foundation; and "Crossing Boundaries" at Winzavod Contemporary Art Center, curated by Mexican curator Claudia Arozqueta. More than 600 artists and art groups from Russia and 52 countries participated in the biennale.

== 1st Moscow International Biennial For Young Art ==
The 1st Moscow International for Young Art was from July 1 - 30, 2008. The theme of the event was "Qui vive?", the main exhibition was curated by Russian curator Daria Pyrkina. More than 400 artists from Russia and 23 foreign countries participated in this biennale.

== Founders and organizers ==
The founders of the biennale are Ministry of Culture of the Russian Federation, the Moscow Department of Culture, the National Centre for Contemporary Arts (NCCA), and the Moscow Museum of Modern Art (MMOMA).
