= Theodore von Kármán bibliography =

Theodore von Kármán
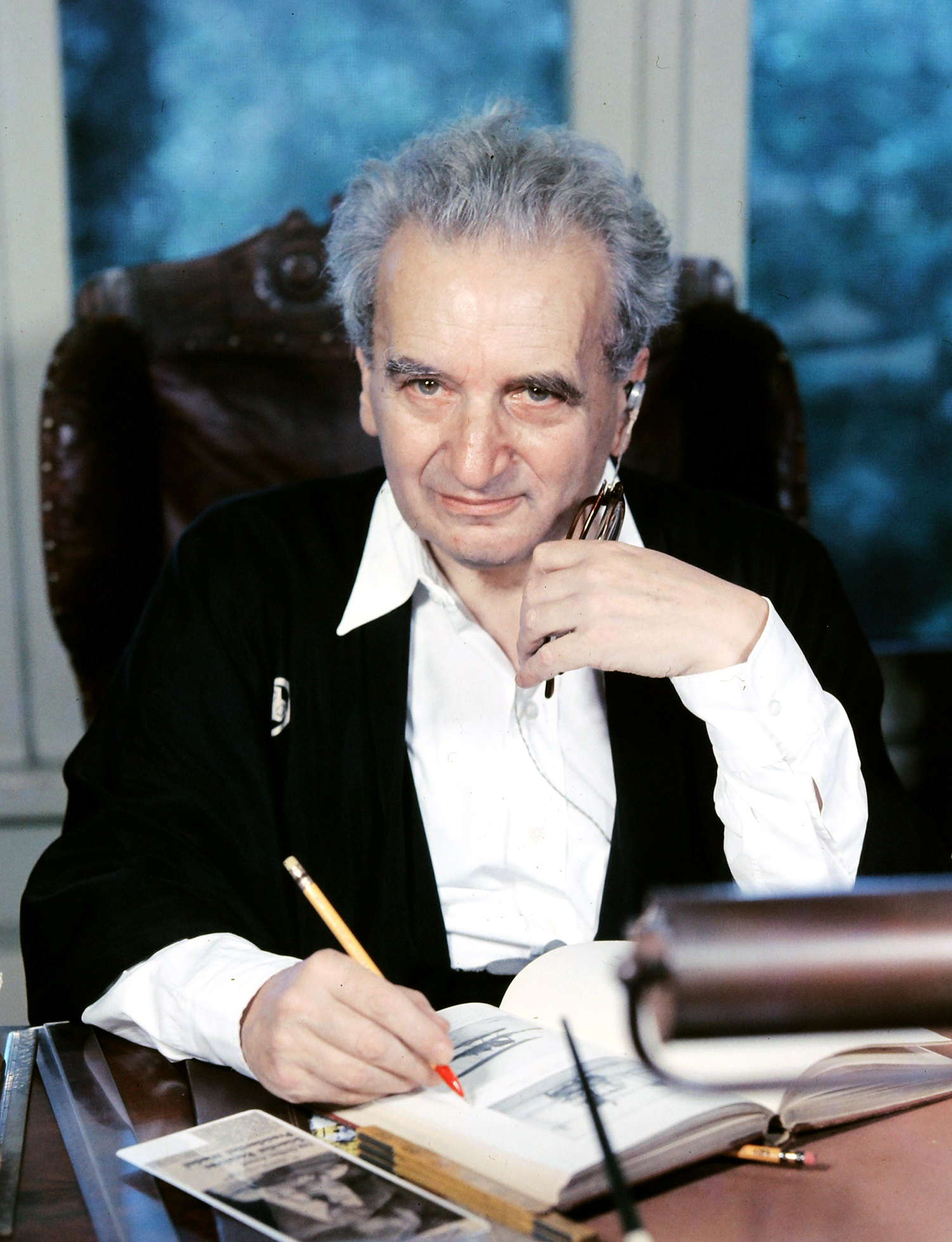
- Von Karman at the Caltech JPL
- Born: 11 May 1881; Budapest, Austria-Hungary
- Died: 6 May 1963 (aged 81); Aachen, West Germany
- Citizenship: Hungarian; American
- Education: Budapest University of Technology and Economics
- Known for: Supersonic and hypersonic airflow characterization; Kármán vortex street
- Awards: ASME Medal (1941); John Fritz Medal (1948); Timoshenko Medal (1958); National Medal of Science (1962); Foreign Member of the Royal Society
- Scientific career
- Fields: Aerospace Engineering
- Workplaces: University of Göttingen, RWTH Aachen, California Institute of Technology, von Karman Institute for Fluid Dynamics
- Thesis: Untersuchungen über Knickfestigkeit (1908)
- Doctoral advisor: Ludwig Prandtl
- Doctoral students: Tsien Hsue-sen; Chia-Chiao Lin; Hu Ning; Maurice Anthony Biot; Ernest Sechler

This is a bibliography of works by Theodore von Kármán.

== Books ==
- Kármán, Th. von; Burgers, J. M. (1924). General Aerodynamic Theory, 2 vols. Julius Springer.
- Kármán, Th. von; Biot, M. A. (1940). Mathematical Methods in Engineering; An introduction to the Mathematical Treatment of Engineering Problems. McGraw-Hill. p. 505. ASIN B0006AOTLK.
- Kármán, Th. von; Biot, M. A. (2004) [Cornell University Press, 1954]. Aerodynamics: Selected Topics in the Light of Their Historical Development. Dover Books on Aeronautical Engineering. Dover Publications. p. 224. ISBN 978-0486434858.
- Kármán, Th. von (1956). Collected Works of Dr. T. von Kármán (1902 - 1951), 4 vols. Vol. v. 1. 1902-1913, v. 2. 1914-1932, v. 3. 1933-1939, v. 4. 1940-1951. London: Butterworths Scientific Publications.
- Kármán, Th. von (1961). From Low-Speed Aerodynamics to Astronautics. Pergamon Press. ASIN B000H4OVPO.
- Kármán, Th. von; Edson, L. (1967). The Wind and Beyond — T. von Kármán Pioneer in Aviation and Pathfinder in Space. Little Brown. p. 376. ISBN 978-0316907538.

== Papers ==
=== 1900s ===
- Kármán, Th. von (1902). "The motion of a heavy rod supported on its rounded end by a horizontal plate". Journal of Mathematics and Physics, Mathematical Society, Budapest, Hungary (in Hungarian). 9.
- Kármán, Th. von (1906). "A kihajlás elmélete és a hosszú rudakon végzett nyomás-kisérletek" [The theory of buckling and compression tests on long slender columns] (PDF). Magyar Mérnök és Építész Egylet Közlönye [Journal of the Society of Hungarian Engineers and Architects] (in Hungarian). 40 (11–12): 329–335.
- Kármán, Th. von (1907). "Über stationäre Wellen in Gasstrahlen" [About stationary waves in gas jets]. Physikalische Zeitschrift (in German). 8.
- Kármán, Th. von (1908). "A gőzök és gázok áramlási jelenségeire vonatkozó újabb vizsgálatok" [Recent investigations regarding the flow phenomena of vapors and gases]. Magyar Mérnök és Építész Egylet Közlönye [Journal of the Society of Hungarian Engineers and Architects] (in Hungarian). 42 (3–4): 103–110.
- Kármán, Th. von (1908). "Igen könnyü mótoro król" [Very light-weight engines]. Magyar Mérnök-És Építész-Egylet Héti-Értesitöje [Weekly Bulletin of the Society of Hungarian Engineers and Architects] (in Hungarian) (27): 248–251.
- Kármán, Th. von (1908). "Die Knickfestigkeit gerader Stäbe" [The buckling strength of straight bars]. Physikalische Zeitschrift (in German). 9.
- Kármán, Th. von; Haar, A. (1909). "Zur Theorie der Spannungszustände in plastischen und sandartigen Medien" [On the theory of stress states in plastic and sand-like media]. Nachrichten der K. Gesellschaft der Wissenschaften zu Göttingen, Mathematisch-physikalische Klasse (in German).
- Kármán, Th. von (1909). "Hullámos tűz csövek szilárdsága" [The strength of corrugated fire tubes]. Magyar Mérnök-És Építész-Egylet Héti-Értesitöje [Weekly Bulletin of the Society of Hungarian Engineers and Architects] (in Hungarian) (28): 302–305.

=== 1910s ===
- Kármán, Th. von (1910). "Mitől függ az anyag igénybevétele?" [What determines the stress-strain behavior of matter?] (PDF). Magyar Mérnök és Építész Egylet Közlönye [Journal of the Society of Hungarian Engineers and Architects] (in Hungarian). 44 (10): 212–226.
- Kármán, Th. von (1910). "Untersuchungen über die Bedingungen des Bruches und der plastischen Deformation, insbesondere bei quasi-isotropen Körpern" [Studies on the conditions of the fracture and plastic deformation, particularly in quasi-isotropic bodies]. Habilitationschrift, Göttingen (in German).
- Kármán, Th. von (1910). Untersuchungen über Knickfestigkeit [Studies on buckling strength] (in German). Vol. 81. pp. 1–45. doi:10.1007/978-3-662-01994-8. hdl:2027/iau.31858059335400. ISBN 978-3-662-01994-8. ;
- Kármán, Th. von (1910). "Festigkeitsprobleme im Maschinenbau" [Strength problems in engineering]. Encyklopädie der Mathematischen Wissenschaften (in German). 4.
- Kármán, Th. von (1911). "Festigkeitsversuche unter allseitigem Druck" [Strength tests under pressure from all sides]. Zeitschrift des Vereines Deutscher Ingenieure (in German). 55.
- Kármán, Th. von (1911). "Über die Formänderung dünnwandiger Röhre, insbesondere federnder Ausgleichröhre" [Strength tests under pressure from all sides]. Zeitschrift des Vereines Deutscher Ingenieure (in German). 55.
- Kármán, Th. von (1911). "(Bemerkung zu der Arbeit von Frau Margrete Bose und Herrn E. Bose) Über die Turbulenzreibung verschiedener Flüssigkeiten" [(Note on the work of Ms. Margrete Bose and Mr. E. Bose) About the turbulence friction of various liquids]. Physikalische Zeitschrift (in German). 12.
- Kármán, Th. von (1911). "Über den Mechanismus des Widerstandes, den ein bewegter Körper in einer Flüssigkeit erfährt" [About the mechanism of resistance that a moving body undergoes in a liquid]. Nachrichten der K. Gesellschaft der Wissenschaften zu Göttingen, Mathematisch-physikalische Klasse (in German).
- Kármán, Th. von (1912). "A göttingeni aerodinamikai állomás mérési eredményei" [The test results of Göttingen aerodynamic station] (PDF). Magyar Mérnök és Építész Egylet Közlönye [Journal of the Society of Hungarian Engineers and Architects] (in Hungarian). 46 (3): 37–43.
- Kármán, Th. von; Rubach, H. (1912). "Über den Mechanismus des Flüssigkeits- und Luftwiderstandes" [On the mechanism of fluid and air resistance]. Physikalische Zeitschrift (in German). 13: 49–59.
- Kármán, Th. von; Born, M. (1912). "Über Schwingungen in Raumgittern" [On fluctuations in spatial grids]. Physikalische Zeitschrift (in German). 13.
- Kármán, Th. von; Föppl, L. (1913). "Physikalische Grundlagen der Festigkeitslehre" [Physical basis of strengths of Materials]. Encyklopädie der Mathematischen Wissenschaften (in German).
- Kármán, Th. von; Born, M. (1913). "Zur Theorie der spezifischen Wärme" [On the theory of the specific heat]. Physikalische Zeitschrift (in German). 14.
- Kármán, Th. von; Born, M. (1913). "Über die Verteilung der Eigenschwingungen von Punktgittern" [The distribution of the natural vibrations of point lattices]. Physikalische Zeitschrift (in German). 14.
- Kármán, Th. von; Born, M. (1913). "(Bemerkungen zu dem gleichlautenden Artikel von H. Lorenz) Näherungslösungen von Problemen der Elastizitätstheorie" [(Comments on the homonymous article by H. Lorenz) Approximate solutions of problems of elasticity theory]. Physikalische Zeitschrift (in German). 14.
- Kármán, Th. von; Bolza, H.; Born, M. (1913). "Molekularströmung und Temperatursprung" [Molecular flow and temperature increase]. Nachrichten der K. Gesellschaft der Wissenschaften zu Göttingen, Mathematisch-physikalische Klasse (in German).
- Kármán, Th. von (1913). "Elastizität" [Elasticity]. de:Handwörterbuch der Naturwissenschaften (in German). 3.
- Kármán, Th. von (1913). "Festigkeit" [Strength]. de:Handwörterbuch der Naturwissenschaften (in German). 3.
- Kármán, Th. von (1913). "Gleichgewicht" [Balance]. de:Handwörterbuch der Naturwissenschaften (in German). 4.
- Kármán, Th. von (1913). "Härte und Härteprüfung" [Hardness and hardness testing]. de:Handwörterbuch der Naturwissenschaften (in German). 5.
- Kármán, Th. von; Trefftz, Erich (1915). "Über Längsstabilität und Längsschwingungen von Flugzeugen". Jahrbuch der Wissenschaftlichen Gesellschaft für Luftfahrt [About longitudinal stability and longitudinal vibrations of airplanes] (in German). Vol. 3. pp. 116–162. doi:10.1007/978-3-642-52154-6_9. ISBN 978-3-642-52154-6.
- Kármán, Th. von (1915). "Research on the conditions of elastic limit and rupture". Matematikai és Természettudományi Értesítő [Math and Science Bulletin] (in Hungarian).
- Kármán, Th. von (1 August 1916). "Das Gedächtnis der Materie" [The memory of the matter]. Die Naturwissenschaften (in German). 4 (33): 489–494. Bibcode:1916NW......4..489V. doi:10.1007/BF01496496. ISSN 1432-1904. S2CID 31900126.
- Kármán, Th. von; Trefftz, Erich (1918). "Potentialströmung um gegebene Tragflächenquerschnitte" [Potential flow about given airfoils cross sections]. Zeitschrift für Flugtechnik und Motorluftschiffahrt (in German). 9.
- Kármán, Th. von (1918). "Lynkeus als Ingenieur und Naturwissenschaftler" [Lynkeus as an engineer and scientist]. Die Naturwissenschaften (in German). 6 (31): 457–463. Bibcode:1918NW......6..457K. doi:10.1007/BF01503243. ISSN 1432-1904. S2CID 35620096.

=== 1920s ===
- Kármán, Th. von (1921). "Die Bedeutung der Mechanik für das Studium der technischen Physiker" [The importance of the mechanics for the study of technical physicist]. Zeitschrift für Technische Physik (in German). 2.
- Kármán, Th. von (1921). "Über laminare und turbulente Reibung" [About laminar and turbulent friction]. Zeitschrift für Angewandte Mathematik und Mechanik (in German). 1 (4): 233–252. Bibcode:1921ZaMM....1..233K. doi:10.1002/zamm.19210010401. ISSN 1521-4001.
- Kármán, Th. von (1921). "Mechanische Modelle zum Segelflug" [Mechanical models for gliding]. Zeitschrift für Flugtechnik und Motorluftschiffahrt (in German). 12.
- Kármán, Th. von (1921). "Theoretische Bemerkungen zur Frage des Schraubenfliegers" [Theoretical remarks on the question of powered aviation]. Zeitschrift für Flugtechnik und Motorluftschiffahrt (in German). 12.
- Kármán, Th. von (1921). "Bemerkung zu der Frage der Strömungsform um Widerstandskörper bei grossen Reynoldsschen Kennzahlen" [Remark on the issue of flow resistance to form body at large Reynolds numbers]. Lectures from the Field of Hydro- and Aerodynamics, Innsbruck; Berlin (in German).
- Kármán, Th. von (1 February 1922). "Über den motorlosen Flug" [About motorless flight]. Die Naturwissenschaften (in German). 10 (6): 121–133. Bibcode:1922NW.....10..121V. doi:10.1007/BF01488103. ISSN 1432-1904. S2CID 41610344.
- Lilienthal, G; Kármán, Th. von (1 April 1922). "von Kármáns Erklärungen des Segelflugs" [von Kármán's explanations of gliding]. Die Naturwissenschaften (in German). 10 (17): 432–434. Bibcode:1922NW.....10..432L. doi:10.1007/BF01571233. ISSN 1432-1904. S2CID 34500602.
- Kármán, Th. von (1922). "Standardization in Aerodynamics". Aerial Age Weekly. 14 (12): 392.
- Kármán, Th. von (1924). "Über die Oberflächenreibung von Flüssigkeiten". Vorträge aus dem Gebiete der Hydro- und Aerodynamik (Innsbruck 1922) [About the surface friction of fluids] (in German). Vol. 14. pp. 146–167. doi:10.1007/978-3-662-00280-3_14. ISBN 978-3-662-00280-3. ;
- Kármán, Th. von (1923). "Über die Grundlagen der Balkentheorie" [Beyond the Basics of the beam theory]. Scripta Universitatis Atque Bibliothecae Hierosolymitanarum (in German).
- Kármán, Th. von (1923). "Gastheoretische Deutung der Reynoldsschen - Kennzahl" [Theoretical interpretation of the Reynolds number]. Zeitschrift für Angewandte Mathematik und Mechanik (in German). 3 (5): 395–396. Bibcode:1923ZaMM....3..395V. doi:10.1002/zamm.19230030506. ISSN 1521-4001.
- Kármán, Th. von (1924). "Über das thermisch-elektrische Gleichgewicht in festen Isolatoren" [About the thermal-electrical balance in solid insulators]. Archiv für Elektrotechnik (in German). 13 (2): 174–180. doi:10.1007/BF01656137. S2CID 111197748.
- Kármán, Th. von (1924). "Die mittragende Breite" [The effective width]. Beiträge zur Technischen Mechanik (in German).
- Bienen, Th.; Kármán, Th. von (1924). "Zur Theorie der Luftschrauben" [On the theory of propellers]. Zeitschrift des Vereines Deutscher Ingenieure (in German). 68: 1315–1318.
- Kármán, Th. von (1924). "Über die Stabilität der Laminarströmung und die Theorie der Turbulenz" [On the stability of the laminar flow and the turbulence theory]. Proceedings of the International Congress for Applied Mechanics (in German). 68.
- Kármán, Th. von (1925). "Beitrag zur Theorie des Walzvorganges" [Contribution to the theory of the rolling process]. Zeitschrift für Angewandte Mathematik und Mechanik (in German). 5 (2): 139–141. Bibcode:1925ZaMM....5..139K. doi:10.1002/zamm.19250050213.
- Kármán, Th. von (1926). "Über elastische Grenzzustände" [About elastic limit states]. Verhandlungen des 2. Internationalen Kongresses für Technische Mechanik (in German). 5.
- Kármán, Th. von (1927). "Berechnung der Druckverteilung an Luftschiffkörpern" [Calculation of the pressure distribution on airship bodies]. Abhandlungen aus dem Aerodynamischen Institut an der Technischcn Hochschule, Aachen (in German). 6.
- Kármán, Th. von (1927). Über die Grundlagen der Balkentheorie [Beyond the Basics of the beam theory] (in German). Vol. 7. ISBN 978-3662313190. ;
- Kármán, Th. von (1927). "Selected problems in aeronautics". J. Aero. Res. Inst., Tokyo (in Japanese). 37.
- Kármán, Th. von (1927). Frank, Ph.; von Mises, R (eds.). "Ideale Flussigkeitens" [Ideal fluids]. Die Differential- und Integralgleichungen der Mechanik und Physik (in German). 2.
- Kármán, Th. von (1927). "Die Schleppversuche mit langen Versuchsflächen und das Ähnlichkeitsgesetz der Oberflächenreibungen" [The towing tests with long experimental plots and the similarity law of surface friction]. Werft, Reederei, Hafen (in German). 9.
- Kármán, Th. von (1928). Zanichelli, Nicola (ed.). "Mathematische Probleme der modernen Aerodynamik" [Mathematical problems of modern aerodynamics]. Atti del Congresso Internazionole dei Matematici, Bologna (in German).
- Kármán, Th. von (1929). "Beitrag zur Theorie des Auftriebes" [Contribution to the theory of lift]. Vorträge aus dem Gebiete der Aerodynamik und Verwandter Gebiete, Aachen (in German).
- Kármán, Th. von (1929). "Beitrag zur Theorie des Auftriebes" [Contribution to the theory of lift]. Vorträge aus dem Gebiete der Aerodynamik und Verwandter Gebiete, Aachen (in German).
- Kármán, Th. von; Friedrichs, K. (1929). "Zur Berechnung freitragender Flügel" [To calculate cantilever wing]. Zeitschrift für Angewandte Mathematik und Mechanik (in German). 9 (4): 261–269. Bibcode:1929ZaMM....9..261F. doi:10.1002/zamm.19290090402. ISSN 1521-4001.
- Kármán, Th. von; Wattendorf, F. L. (1929). "The impact on seaplane floats during landing". National Advisory Committee for Aeronautics, Technical Note. 321.

=== 1930s ===
- Kármán, Th. von; Wattendorf, F. L. (1930). "Mathematik und technische Wissenschaften" [Mathematics and Engineering Sciences]. Die Naturwissenschaften (in German). 18 (1): 12–16. Bibcode:1930NW.....18...12V. doi:10.1007/BF01500951. S2CID 9793761.
- Kármán, Th. von (1930). "Mechanische Ähnlichkeit und Turbulenz" [Mechanical similarity and turbulence]. Nachrichten von der Gesellschaft der Wissenschaften zu Göttingen Mathematisch-physikalische Klasse (in German).
- Kármán, Th. von (1930). "Mechanische Ähnlichkeit und Turbulenz" [Mechanical similarity and turbulence]. Proceedings of the Third International Congress of Applied Mechanics (in German).
- Kármán, Th. von; Huber, K. (1930). "Zuschriften an den Herausgeber" [Letters to the Editor]. Zeitschrift für Angewandte Mathematik und Mechanik (in German). 10 (2): 206–208. Bibcode:1930ZaMM...10..206S. doi:10.1002/zamm.19300100222. ISSN 1521-4001.
- Kármán, Th. von (1931). "Die Seitenwege der Luftfahrt" [The byways of aviation]. Zeitschrift für Flugtechnik und Motorluftschiffahrt (in German). 22.
- Kármán, Th. von; Moore, N. (1932). "The resistance of slender bodies moving with supersonic velocities". Transactions of the American Society of Mechanical Engineers. 54: 303–310. doi:10.1115/1.4021846. ISSN 0097-6822. S2CID 258196905.
- Kármán, Th. von; Moore, N. (1932). "Theorie des Reibungswiderstandes". Hydromechanische Probleme des Schiffsantriebs [Theory of the frictional resistance] (in German). pp. 50–73. doi:10.1007/978-3-642-47554-2_2. ISBN 978-3-642-47206-0. ;
- Kármán, Th. von (1932). "Quelques problèmes actuels de l'aérodynamique" [Some current problems of aerodynamics]. Journées Techniques Internationales de l'Aéronautique (in French).
- Kármán, Th. von (1933). "Some aerodynamic problems of airships". The Daniel Guggenheim Airship Institute Publication. 1.
- Kármán, Th. von (1933). "Analysis of some typical thin-walled structures". Aeronautical Engineering. 5 (4): 155–158.
- Kármán, Th. von; Millikan, C. (1933). "The use of the wind tunnel in connection with aircraft-design problems" (PDF). Transactions of the American Society of Mechanical Engineers. 56 (4): 151–166. doi:10.1115/1.4019682. ISSN 0097-6822. S2CID 256805446.
- Kármán, Th. von (January 1934). "Turbulence and skin friction". Journal of the Aeronautical Sciences. 1 (1): 1–20. doi:10.2514/8.5. ISSN 1533-385X. OCLC 809393.
- Kármán, Th. von (1934). "Turbolenza e attrito superficiale" [Turbulence and surface friction]. The Aerotecnica (in Italian). 14.
- Kármán, Th. von; Millikan, C. (1934). "On the theory of laminar boundary layers involving separation" (PDF). National Advisory Committee for Aeronautics Report. 504.
- Kármán, Th. von (1934). "Some aspects of the turbulence problem". Proceedings of the Fourth International Congress of Applied Mechanics, Cambridge, Mass.
- Kármán, Th. von; Burgers, J. (1935). Durand, W. F. (ed.). "General Aerodynamic Theory: Perfect Fluids". Aerodynamic Theory. 2.
- Kármán, Th. von; Millikan, C. (1935). "A theoretical investigation of the maximum-lift coefficient". Journal of Applied Mechanics. 2 (1): A21–A27. Bibcode:1935JAM.....2A..21V. doi:10.1115/1.4008596.
- Kármán, Th. von (1935). "Neue Darstellung der Tragflügeltheorie" [New representation of the wing theory]. Zeitschrift für Angewandte Mathematik und Mechanik (in German). 15 (1–2): 56–61. Bibcode:1935ZaMM...15...56V. doi:10.1002/zamm.19350150113. ISSN 1521-4001.
- Kármán, Th. von (1935). "The problem of resistance in compressible fluids". Quinto Convegno "Volta," Roma [Proceedings of the 5th Volta Conference, Rome]: 255–264.
- Kármán, Th. von; Sechier, E.; Donnell, H. (1937). "The strength of thin plates in compression". Transactions of the American Society of Mechanical Engineers. 54 (5). ISSN 0097-6822.
- Kármán, Th. von (1937). "On the statistical theory of turbulence". Proceedings of the National Academy of Sciences. 23 (2): 98–105. Bibcode:1937PNAS...23...98V. doi:10.1073/pnas.23.2.98. PMC 1076876. PMID 16588135.
- Kármán, Th. von (1937). "The fundamentals of the statistical theory of turbulence". Journal of the Aeronautical Sciences. 4 (4): 131–188. doi:10.2514/8.350. ISSN 1533-385X. OCLC 809393.
- Kármán, Th. von (December 1937). "Turbulence". Aeronautical Reprints. 41 (324): 1109–1142. doi:10.1017/s0368393100103785. S2CID 243003666.
- Kármán, Th. von; Howarth, L. (1938). "On the statistical theory of isotropic turbulence". Proceedings of the Royal Society of London. 164 (2): 98–105. Bibcode:1938RSPSA.164..192D. doi:10.1098/rspa.1938.0013.
- Kármán, Th. von (1938). "Eine praktische Anwendung der Analogie zwischen Überschallströmung in Gasen und überkritischer Strömung in offenen Gerinnen" [A practical application of the analogy between supersonic flow in gases and supercritical flow in open channels]. Zeitschrift für Angewandte Mathematik und Mechanik (in German). 18 (1): 49–56. Bibcode:1938ZaMM...18...49K. doi:10.1002/zamm.19380180108. ISSN 1521-4001.
- Kármán, Th. von; Tsien, H. S. (April 1938). "Boundary layer in compressible fluids". Journal of the Aeronautical Sciences. 5 (6): 227–232. doi:10.2514/8.591. ISSN 1533-385X. OCLC 809393.
- Kármán, Th. von; Sears, W. (1938). "Airfoil theory for non-uniform motion". Journal of the Aeronautical Sciences. 5 (10): 379–390. doi:10.2514/8.674. ISSN 1533-385X. OCLC 809393.
- Kármán, Th. von (1938). "Some remarks on the statistical theory of turbulence". Proceedings of the Fifth International Congress of Applied Mechanics.
- Kármán, Th. von; Malina, F. (1938). "A series of lectures on aeronautics". Popular Educator (2).
- Kármán, Th. von (1939). "The analogy between fluid friction and heat transfer". Transactions of the American Society of Mechanical Engineers. 61. ISSN 0097-6822.
- Kármán, Th. von; Tsien, H. S. (December 1939). "The buckling of spherical shells by external pressure". Journal of the Aeronautical Sciences. 7 (2): 43–50. doi:10.2514/8.1019. ISSN 1533-385X. OCLC 809393.
- Kármán, Th. von (1938). "Use of orthogonal functions in structural problems". Contributions to the Mechanics of Solids, Stephen Timoshenko 60th Anniversary Volume.

=== 1940s ===
- Kármán, Th. von (1940). "Some remarks on mathematics from the engineer's viewpoint". Mechanical Engineering.
- Kármán, Th. von; Dunn, L.; Tsien, H. S. (1940). "The influence of curvature on the buckling characteristics of structures". Journal of the Aeronautical Sciences. 7 (7): 276–289. doi:10.2514/8.1123. ISSN 1533-385X. OCLC 809393.
- Kármán, Th. von (1940). "The engineer grapples with nonlinear problems" (PDF). Bulletin of the American Mathematical Society. 46 (8): 615–683. doi:10.1090/s0002-9904-1940-07266-0. ISSN 1088-9485.
- Kármán, Th. von; Malina, F. (1940). "Characteristics of the ideal solid propellant rocket motor". Jet Propulsion Laboratory, California Institute of Technology, Report. 1–4 (2).
- Kármán, Th. von (21 November 1940). "Aerodynamic stability of suspension bridges". Engineering News-Record: 40. ISSN 0013-807X.
- Kármán, Th. von; Tsien, H. S. (1941). "The buckling of thin cylindrical shells under axial compressions". Journal of the Aeronautical Sciences. 8 (8): 303–312. doi:10.2514/8.10722. ISSN 1533-385X. OCLC 809393.
- Kármán, Th. von; Tsien, H. S. (July 1941). "Compressibility effects in aerodynamics". Journal of the Aeronautical Sciences. 8 (9): 337–356. doi:10.2514/8.10737. ISSN 1533-385X. OCLC 809393.
- Kármán, Th. von (1941). "Problems of flow in compressible fluids". University of Pennsylvania Bicentennial Conference.
- Kármán, Th. von (1942). "Isaac Newton and aerodynamics". Journal of the Aeronautical Sciences. 9 (14): 521–522. doi:10.2514/8.10958. ISSN 1533-385X. OCLC 809393.
- Kármán, Th. von (1943). "Tooling up mathematics for engineering". Quarterly of Applied Mathematics. 1.
- Kármán, Th. von (1943). "The role of fluid mechanics in modern warfare". Proceedings of the Second Hydraulics Conference Bulletin 27, University of Iowa Studies in Engineering. 1.
- Kármán, Th. von; Tsien, H. S.; Malina, F. (1943). "Summary of "The possibilities of long-range rocket projectiles"". Memorandum JPL-1. 20.
- Kármán, Th. von; Malina, F.; Summerfield, M.; Tsien, H. S. (1943). "Summary of "Comparative study of jet propulsion systems as applied to missiles and transonic aircraft"". Memorandum JPL-2. 28.
- Kármán, Th. von; Christensen, N. B. (April 1944). "Methods of analysis for torsion with variable twist". Journal of the Aeronautical Sciences. 11 (2): 110–124. doi:10.2514/8.11111. ISSN 1533-385X. OCLC 809393.
- Kármán, Th. von; Tsien, H. S. (1945). "Lifting-line theory for a wing in non-uniform flow". Quarterly of Applied Mechanics. 3.
- Kármán, Th. von (1945). "Atomic engineering?". Mechanical Engineering. 67.
- Kármán, Th. von (1945). "Faster than sound". Journal of the Washington Academy of Sciences. 35.
- Kármán, Th. von; Wei-zang, C. (1946). "Torsion with variable twist". Journal of the Aeronautical Sciences. 13 (10): 503–510. doi:10.2514/8.11437.
- Kármán, Th. von (1946). "On laminar and turbulent friction". NACA Technical Memorandum. 1092.
- Kármán, Th. von (1946). "Some investigations on transonic and supersonic flow". Sixth International Congress of Applied Mechanics.
- Kármán, Th. von (July 1947). "Supersonic aerodynamics - principles and applications". Journal of the Aeronautical Sciences. 14 (7): 373–402. doi:10.2514/8.1394. ISSN 1533-385X. OCLC 809393.
- Kármán, Th. von (1947). "The similarity law of transonic flow". Journal of Mathematics and Physics. 24.
- Kármán, Th. von (1947). "Theoretical considerations on stability and control at high- speeds". Proceedings of the Joint Aeronautical Conference Convened by the Royal Aeronautical Society and the Institute of the Aeronautical Sciences.
- Kármán, Th. von (1947). "Sand ripples in the desert". Technion Yearbook.
- Kármán, Th. von (Spring 1947). "Aerothermodynamics". Columbia University Lectures (Lectures in the Dept. Of Physics Prepared by William Perl.).
- Kármán, Th. von (1947). "Sur la théorie statistique de la turbulence" [On the statistical theory of turbulence]. Comptes rendus hebdomadaires des séances de l'Académie des Sciences (in French). 226.
- Kármán, Th. von; Valensi, J. (1948). "Application de la théorie de la couche limite au probléme des oscillations d'un fluide visqueux et pesant dans un tube en U" [Application of the theory of boundary layer problem of oscillations of a viscous fluid and weighing in a U-tube]. Comptes rendus hebdomadaires des séances de l'Académie des Sciences (in French). 227.
- Kármán, Th. von (1948). "Progress in the statistical theory of turbulence". Journal of Marine Research. 7 (11): 530–9.
- Kármán, Th. von (1948). "L'aérodynamique dans l'art de l'ingénieur" [Aerodynamics in the art engineering]. Mémoires de la Société des Ingénieurs Civils de France (in French).
- Kármán, Th. von (December 1948). "Progress in aviation". Journal of the Franklin Institute. 246 (6): 451–452. Bibcode:1948FrInJ.246..451V. doi:10.1016/0016-0032(48)90260-9.
- Kármán, Th. von; Lin, C. C. (1949). "On the concept of similarity in the theory of isotropic turbulence" (PDF). Reviews of Modern Physics. 21 (3): 516–519. Bibcode:1949RvMP...21..516V. doi:10.1103/revmodphys.21.516.
- Kármán, Th. von (1949). "On the theory of thrust augmentation". Reissner Anniversary Vol. Contributions to Applied Mechanics.
- Kármán, Th. von (1949). "Accelerated flow of an incompressible fluid with wake formation". Annali di Matematica Pura ed Applicata. IV. 29: 247–249. doi:10.1007/BF02413930. S2CID 123138737.
- Gabrielli, G.; Kármán, Th. von (1949). "What price speed? Specific power required for propulsion of vehicles". Mechanical Engineering. 72: 775–781.

=== 1950s ===
- Kármán, Th. von; Duwez, P. (1950). "The propagation of plastic deformation in solids" (PDF). Journal of Applied Physics. 21 (10): 987. Bibcode:1950JAP....21..987V. doi:10.1063/1.1699544.
- Kármán, Th. von; Fabri, J. (1950). "Ecoulement transsonique à deux dimensions le long d'une paroi ondulée" [Transonic flow in two dimensions along a corrugated wall]. Comptes rendus hebdomadaires des séances de l'Académie des Sciences (in French). 231.
- Kármán, Th. von (1950). "Considérations aérodynamiques sur la formation des ondulations du sable" [Aerodynamic considerations on the formation of sand ripples]. Colloques Internationaux du Centre National de la Recherche Scientifique, XXXV, Actions éoliennes. Phénomènes d'Évaporation et d'Hydrologie Superficielle dans les Régions Arides (in French): 103–108.
- Kármán, Th. von; Lin, C. C. (1951). "On the statistical theory of isotropic turbulence". Advances in Applied Mechanics. 2: 516–519.
- Kármán, Th. von (1951). "19". Introductory remarks on turbulence. p. 129. Bibcode:1951pca..conf..129V.
- Kármán, Th. von (1951). "The theory of shock waves and the second law of thermodynamics". L'Aerotecnica. 31.
- Kármán, Th. von; Farquharson, F. B.; Dunn, L. G. (1952). "Aerodynamic stability of suspension bridges, Part IV. The investigation of models of the original Tacoma Narrows Bridge under the action of the wind, Part III". Bulletin of the University of Washington Engineering Experimental Station. 116.
- Kármán, Th. von (1952). "Jet-assisted take-off". Interavia: Review of World Aviation. 7.
- Kármán, Th. von (1952). "On the foundation of high speed aerodynamics". Proceedings of the First U.S. National Congress of Applied Mechanics.
- Kármán, Th. von; Millán, G (1953). "The thermal theory of constant pressure deflagration". Anniversary Volume on Applied Mechanics, Dedicated to C. B. Biezeno.
- Kármán, Th. von (1953). "Aerothermodynamics and combustion theory". L'Aerotecnica. 33.
- Kármán, Th. von (1953). "Foundations of operational research". Proceedings of the Third AGARD General Assembly. AG6/P3.
- Kármán, Th. von; Millán, G. (1953). "Thermal theory of a laminar flame front near a cold wall" (PDF). Symposium (International) on Combustion. 4: 173–177. doi:10.1016/S0082-0784(53)80023-8.
- Kármán, Th. von; Fenner, S. S. (1953). "The thermal theory of constant pressure deflagration for first-order global reactions". Scientific Papers Presented to Max Born.
- Kármán, Th. von (1953). "A few comments on rocketry". Interavia; Review of World Aviation. 8.
- Kármán, Th. von (1954). "A. On the Foundation of High Speed Aerodynamics". In Sears, W. R. (ed.). On the foundation of high speed aerodynamics. Vol. 6. pp. 1–30. doi:10.1515/9781400877553-003. ISBN 9781400877553. ;
- Kármán, Th. von; Fenner, S. S. (1954). "Fundamental approach to laminar flame propagation". AGARD Publ., Selected Combustion Problems, Part 1.
- Kármán, Th. von (1955). "Solved and unsolved problems of high speed aerodynamics". Conference of High Speed Aerodynamics.
- Kármán, Th. von (1955). "Models in thermogasdynamics". I Modelli Nella Tecnica, Atti del Convegno di Venezia. 1.
- Kármán, Th. von (July 1955). "Guided missiles in war and peace". Aero Digest. 71 (1): 21, 23.
- Kármán, Th. von (January 1955). "The next fifty years". Interavia; Review of World Aviation. 10 (1): 20, 21.
- Kármán, Th. von; Lin, C. C. (June 1955). "Theoretical comments on the paper of Mr. E. N. Fales". Journal of the Franklin Institute. 259 (6): 517–518. Bibcode:1955FrInJ.259..517V. doi:10.1016/0016-0032(55)90097-1.
- Kármán, Th. von (1956). "Fundamental equations in aerothermochemistry". AGARD Publ., Selected Combustion Problems, Part 2.
- Kármán, Th. von (1956). "Aerodynamic heating - the temperature barrier in aeronautics". Proceedings High-Temperature Symposium.
- Kármán, Th. von (1956). "Dimensionslose Größen in Grenzgebieten der Aerodynamik" [Dimensionless variables in border areas of aerodynamics]. Z. Flugwiss (in German). 4.
- Kármán, Th. von (June 1956). "Faster, higher, hotter". Interavia; Review of World Aviation. 11 (6): 407.
- Kármán, Th. von; Fenner, S. S. (1956). "The theory of one-dimensional laminar flame propagation for hydrogenbromine mixtures, Dissociation Neglected". Guggenheim Jet Propulsion Center, California Institute of Technology, Tech. Rep. 16.
- Kármán, Th. von; Millán, G. (1956). "The theory of one-dimensional laminar flame propagation for hydrogenbromine mixtures, Dissociation Included". Guggenheim Jet Propulsion Center, California Institute of Technology, Tech. Rep. 16.
- Kármán, Th. von (1956). "Some remarks on combustion instability in rockets". AGARD Paper.
- Kármán, Th. von; Driscoll, B. J. (1956). "Pathways for cooperation in NATO research and development". AGARD Publication.
- Kármán, Th. von (1957). "Aerodynamische Erwärmung - die Hitzeschwelle in der Luftfahrt" [Aerodynamic heating - the heat threshold in aviation]. Flugwelt (in German). 9.
- Kármán, Th. von (1957). "Algunas reflexiones sobre el estado actual de la astronáutica" [Some thoughts on the current state of astronautics]. Ingeniería Aeronautica (in Spanish). 9.
- Kármán, Th. von (August 1957). "Some observations on guided missiles". Interavia; Review of World Aviation. 12 (8): 777–778.
- Kármán, Th. von (December 1957). "More or less seriously". Inferavia: Review of World Aviation. 12 (12): 1227–1228.
- Kármán, Th. von (February 1958). "Lanchester's contributions to the theory of flight and operational research". Journal of the Royal Aeronautical Society. 62: 80–93.
- Kármán, Th. von (1958). Emmons, H. W. (ed.). "Aerothermodynamic problems of combustion. General Aspects of the combustion problem". High Speed Aerodynamics and Jet Propulsion. 3.
- Kármán, Th. von (1958). "Magnetofluidmechanics". Proceedings Ninth International Astronautical Congress. 2.
- Kármán, Th. von (1958). "Magnetofluidomecanica" [Magnetofluidmechanics]. Ingeniería Aeronautica (in Spanish). 10.
- Kármán, Th. von (March 1959). "Some significant developments in aerodynamics since 1946". Journal of the Aero/Space Sciences. 26 (3): 129–144, 154. doi:10.2514/8.7977.
- Kármán, Th. von (1959). "Applications of magnetofluidmechanics". Astronautics. 4.
- Kármán, Th. von (1959). "Some comments on applications of magnetofluidmcchanics, Introduction". Third Biennial Gas Dynamics Symposium. IX–XI.
- Kármán, Th. von (1959). "Magnetofluidmechanics, some comments in memory of D. Banki". Acta Technica Academiae Scientiae Hungaricae. 27.
- Kármán, Th. von (1959). "Excerpts from a talk at Cornell University (Guest Editorial)". Aerospace Engineering. 18.

=== 1960s ===
- Kármán, Th. von (1961). "How to improve scientific cooperation in NATO". NATO Journal. 1.
- Kármán, Th. von (1961). "Space-age education". Astronautics. 6.
- Kármán, Th. von (1961). "Engineering education in our age". Journal of Engineering Education. 52.
- Kármán, Th. von; Lin, C. C. (1961). "On the existence of an exact solution of the equations of Navier-Stokes". Communications on Pure and Applied Mathematics. 14.
- Kármán, Th. von (1962). "Introductory remarks on space propulsion problems". Advances in Astronautical Propulsion (Proceedings of a Seminar Held in Milan by Instituto Lombardo Accademia di Scienze e Lettere in Collaboration with AGARD, 1960).
- Kármán, Th. von (1962). "The developing role of nuclear energy in aerospace technology". IRE Transactions on Nuclear Science. 9 (1): 49–51. Bibcode:1962IRTNS...9...49V. doi:10.1109/TNS2.1962.4315889. S2CID 51639305.
- Kármán, Th. von (1962). Diax, J. B.; Pai, S. I. (eds.). "Non-linear buckling of thin shells". Fluid Dynamics and Applied Mathematics. ASIN B00K2Y0GSA.
- Kármán, Th. von; Kerr, A. D. (1965). Abir, D.; Ollendorff, F.; Reiner, M. (eds.). "Instability of spherical shells subjected to external pressure". Topics in Applied Mechanics (Schwerin Memorial Volume). ASIN B0093DD5Z2.

== Patents ==
- GB patent 137332, Th. von Kármán & W. Zurovec, "Improvements in captive flying machines of the helicopter type", published 23 December 1920
- FR patent 520165, Th. von Kármán & W. Zurovec, "Hélicoptère captif [tethered helicopter]", published 21 June 1921
- DE patent 346425C, Th. von Kármán & W. Zurovec, "Schraubenfesselflieger [tethered helicopter]", published 30 December 1921
- AT patent 87697B, Th. von Kármán & W. Zurovec, "Schraubenfesselflieger [tethered helicopter]", published 27 March 1922
- AT patent 87763B, Th. von Kármán & H. Latzko, "Messinstrument insbesondere für Flugzeuge [Measuring instrument in particular for aircraft]", published 27 March 1922
- AT patent 87919B, Th. von Kármán & H. Latzko, "Einrichtung zum selbsttätigen Erfassen und Abwerfen von Gegenständen während des Fluges [Means for automatically detecting and dropping of objects during flight]", published 10 April 1922
- DE patent 438209C, Th. von Kármán, "Sperrholz-Bauplatte, insbesondere für Luftfahrzeuge [Plywood plywood, especially for aircraft]", published 8 December 1926
- GB patent 235884A, Th. von Kármán & P. Stock, "Improvements in building materials for light structures", published 3 February 1927
- DE patent 443163C, Th. von Kármán & K. Frommn, "Schaufelung für Turbomaschinen u. dgl. [For turbomachinery blading, etc.]", published 22 April 1927
- DE patent 453728C, Th. von Kármán, "Baustoff für Leichtbau [Building material for lightweight]", published 16 December 1927
- DE patent 455515C, Th. von Kármán, "Baustoff für Leichtbau [Building material for lightweight]", published 3 February 1928
- DE patent 507989C, Th. von Kármán, "Verfahren zur Herstellung von Metallfluegeln mit vollem, aber veraenderlichem Querschnitt für Trieb körper [Method for producing metal wings with a full, but variable cross section for engine body]", published 23 September 1930
- GB patent 747890A, S. W. Yuan & Th. von Kármán, "Rotary wing aircraft", published 18 April 1956
- CA patent 561896A, S. W. Yuan & Th. von Kármán, "Aircraft", published 19 August 1958
