= Thierry Poinsot =

French researcher

Thierry Poinsot (born 22 March 1958), is a French researcher, research director at the CNRS, researcher at the Institute of Fluid Mechanics in Toulouse, scientific advisor at CERFACS and senior research fellow at Stanford University. He has been a member of the French Academy of sciences since 2019.

== Biography ==
Engineer from École Centrale de Paris (1980, now Centralesupelec), he obtained a doctorate in engineering in 1983 and a state thesis in 1987 before working at Stanford for two years (1988-1990). He currently works in Toulouse. His areas of expertise are fluid mechanics, combustion, propulsion, acoustics, high performance computing.

== Professional positions ==
Poinsot has taught since 1980 at Ecole Centrale Paris, Stanford, ISAE and ENSEEIHT in Toulouse, Princeton, Tsinghua, Kanpur, CISM, and the von Karmann Institute. He was head of the MIR group (reactive media) at the Institute of Fluid Mechanics in Toulouse from 2010 to 2017 and member of the scientific council of PRACE from 2008 to 2013.

He has been a consultant for IFP Energies Nouvelles, Air Liquide, Siemens, Daimler, and John Zink, Senior research fellow at the Center for Turbulence Research at Stanford since 1990, scientific advisor at CERFACS since 1992, chief editor (with Pr F. Egofopoulos, University of Southern California) of Combustion and Flame since 2013, expert at the European Commission for the ERC (European Research Council) programmes since 2014 and member of the Board of Directors of the Combustion Institute since 2016.

== Scientific contributions ==
His work focuses mainly on combustion, fluid mechanics and energy. To do this, he uses experiments and theoretical methods. In addition, he relies on high performance numerical simulation which consists in creating 'virtual' digital twins of real systems (such as an airplane or helicopter engine) thanks to supercomputers now comprising several million processors (see Top500).

After his PhD thesis on the physical mechanisms controlling the cooking of tyres (for Michelin), he developed experimental and theoretical studies of combustion instabilities and their control in aeronautical engines under the direction of Sébastien Candel at the EM2C laboratory at Centrale Paris. He has also developed models for turbulent combustion.

During his two-year postdoctoral fellowship at Stanford, he set up the first direct simulations of turbulent flames. These first academic simulations paved the way for numerical simulation tools for real combustion chambers which use the largest computers available today and are used to calculate French aeronautical combustion chambers (rockets, helicopters, aircraft, furnaces). In addition to this numerical simulation work, he has also developed theoretical and experimental activities on combustion at the IMFT.

He is currently interested in aeronautical engines and the energy generation systems of the future as well as in the storage of renewable energies using hydrogen. He has made a major contribution to the pooling of major numerical simulation codes for fluid mechanics in France and Europe and his codes are used by hundreds of researchers and engineers. His work has been supported since 2013 by two European ERC (European Research Council) projects: INTECOCIS and SCIROCCO.

He is the author or co-author of Theoretical and numerical combustion with D. Veynante, a textbook on combustion, and 220 articles in peer-reviewed journals

== Awards ==
- CNRS Bronze medal in 1988.
- Best DRET researcher in 1991.
- First Cray prize in 1993.
- Edmond Brun Prize of the French Academy of sciences in 1996.
- First BMW prize for the supervision of B. Caruelle's thesis in 2002.
- Grand Prix de l'Académie des sciences, Paris, 2003.
- AIAA Associate Fellow in 2003.
- CNRS 'Prime d'excellence scientifique' in 2009–2013.
- ERC advanced grant in 2013 on thermoacoustic instabilities.
- ERC advanced grant in 2019 on hydrogen storage of renewable energy
- Hottel plenary lecture at the 36th Symp.(Int.) Comb. 2016 (Seoul).
- Zeldovich Gold medal of the Combustion Institute, 2016.
- Fellow of the Combustion Institute in 2018.
- EPSC Award in 2021
