= Stephen B. Pope =

Cornell University professor of mechanical engineering

Stephen B. Pope is the Sibley College Professor of Mechanical Engineering at Cornell University.

He was awarded the status of Fellow in the American Physical Society, after being nominated by their Division of Fluid Dynamics in 1991, for contributions of archival value to probability-density-function methods in turbulence modeling, to understanding of the geometry and distortion of surfaces in turbulent flows, and to extraction of Lagrangian statistics from direct numerical simulations. He is the recipient of 2008 Ya. B. Zeldovich Gold Medal from The Combustion Institute. and Propellants and Combustion Award (2012) from American Institute of Aeronautics and Astronautics. He is currently in the editorial board of Combustion Theory and Modelling

Pope was elected a member of the National Academy of Engineering in 2010 for contributions to the modeling of turbulent flow, including the development of probability density function methodologies for turbulent combustion.

== See also ==
- List of fellows of the American Physical Society (1972–1997)
