= Combustion Theory and Modelling =

- Discipline: Combustion
- Language: English
- Edited by: Moshe Matalon, Mitchell D. Smooke

Publication details
- History: 1997–present
- Publisher: Taylor & Francis
- Frequency: Bimonthly
- Impact factor: 1.9 (2023)

Standard abbreviations
- ISO 4: Combust. Theory Model.

Indexing
- CODEN: CTMOFQ
- ISSN: 1364-7830 (print); 1741-3559 (web)
- LCCN: sn97052036
- OCLC no.: 629712091

Links
- Journal homepage; Online access; Online archive

Combustion Theory and Modelling is a bimonthly peer-reviewed scientific journal covering research on combustion. The editors-in-chief are Moshe Matalon (University of Illinois at Urbana–Champaign) and Mitchell D. Smooke (Yale University). It is published by Taylor & Francis and was established in 1997. The founding editors are John W. Dold and Mitchell D. Smooke.

== Abstracting and indexing ==
The journal is abstracted and indexed in,

- Applied Mechanics Reviews
- Astrophysics Data System
- Chemical Abstracts Service
- CSA databases
- Current Contents/Engineering, Computing and Technology
- Ei Compendex
- FLUIDEX
- Inspec
- Mathematical Reviews
- Science Citation Index
- Scopus
- Zentralblatt MATH

According to the Journal Citation Reports, the journal has a 2020 impact factor of 1.777.

== See also ==
- Combustion Science and Technology
- Combustion and Flame
- Proceedings of the Combustion Institute
- Progress in Energy and Combustion Science
- AIAA Journal
- Journal of Propulsion and Power
