= Paul A. Libby =

American scientist (1921–2021)

- Born: Paul Andrews Libby; September 4, 1921; Mineola, New York, U.S.
- Died: November 2, 2021 (aged 100); La Jolla, California, U.S.
- Education: Polytechnic Institute of Brooklyn
- Known for: Bray–Moss–Libby model Becker–Morduchow–Libby solution
- Scientific career
- Fields: Fluid dynamics Combustion; Aerospace Engineering
- Workplaces: Polytechnic Institute of Brooklyn; University of California, San Diego
- Thesis: The Structure of a Shock-Wave according to the Navier-Stokes Equations (1949)
- Doctoral advisor: Russell P. Harrington; Paul Lieber

Paul Andrews Libby (September 4, 1921 – November 2, 2021) was a professor of mechanical and aerospace engineering at the University of California, San Diego, a specialist in the field of combustion and aerospace engineering.

== Biography ==
Libby received his bachelor's degree in 1942 and obtained his PhD in 1949, both from Polytechnic Institute of Brooklyn. After his bachelor's degree, he worked at Chance Vought Aircraft for two years and then served in the United States Navy during World War II until 1946 in between his Bachelors and Doctorate degrees; he was a Junior Grade Lieutenant when discharged.

He joined the faculty of Polytechnic Institute of Brooklyn and advanced to the rank of Professor. At that time, the famous aerodynamicist Antonio Ferri, a friend of Theodore von Kármán, joined the Polytechnic Institute of Brooklyn. Libby worked with Ferri as an assistant for ten years. In 1962, when Sol Penner was looking for faculty for the newly-founded School of Engineering at the University of California, San Diego, Libby was recommended to Penner by von Kármán. He joined UCSD in 1964 as one of the 10 founding faculty members. He served as department chair from 1973 to 1976. He also served as Acting Dean and Associate Dean of Graduate affairs.

Libby died in La Jolla, California, on November 2, 2021, at the age of 100.

== Research ==
Libby's research focused on a broad range of topics in fluid dynamics including boundary layers, turbulence, aerothermochemistry and combustion. The structure of shock waves was exactly solved by Morduchow and Libby in 1949, demonstrating that the entropy of the gas goes through a maximum upon crossing the shock wave. He, along with Keith Stewartson, were the first to identify the eigensolutions of boundary layer equations and to study the uniqueness of the boundary-layer solutions. Homann flow, axisymmetric stagnation point flows, were generalized by Libby. Paul Libby, along with Kenneth Bray, discovered an important phenomenon known as Counter-gradient diffusion in turbulent flames, in a series of papers in the '80s which are considered important contributions to our understanding of turbulent combustion.

== Publications ==
He produced more than 200 journal publications throughout his career. He authored numerous books and monographs, which include An Introduction to Turbulence, Turbulent Reacting Flows (co-authored with Forman A. Williams), Space Flight and Re-Entry Trajectories, A Theoretical Analysis of the Turbulent Mixing of Reactive Gases with Application to the Supersonic Combustion of Hydrogen, Some Perturbation Solutions in Laminar Boundary Layer Theory, and Theoretical and Experimental Investigation of Supersonic Combustion.

== Honors ==
Libby was elected a member of the National Academy of Engineering in 1999 for contributions as a researcher, author, and educator who advanced knowledge of fluid dynamics, turbulence, and combustion through theoretical analyses. He was a Guggenheim Fellow and a Guest Fellow of the British Royal Society. Combustion Science and Technology issued a special issue in honor of Libby's 100th birthday.

== See also ==
- Stanford S. Penner
- Forman A. Williams
