= Peter B. Sunderland =

American engineer and academic

Peter B. Sunderland is a professor of fire protection engineering and Keystone Professor at the University of Maryland, College Park. He earned a bachelor's degree in mechanical engineering at Cornell University, a master's degree in mechanical engineering from the University of Massachusetts Amherst, and a Ph.D. in aerospace engineering from the University of Michigan. Prior to joining the University of Maryland, he worked at the National Center for Microgravity Research at the NASA Glenn Research Center.

Sunderland's research interests are in combustion and fire protection, including soot formation and oxidation, laminar diffusion flames, microgravity combustion, wildland fires, diagnostics development, refrigerant flammability, hydrogen flames, and vehicle fires. He has published 55 journal articles. His research has been funded by the National Science Foundation, NASA, the National Institute of Standards and Technology, and the National Fire Protection Association. He was a member of the executive committee of the U.S. sections of the Combustion Institute and is an associate editor of the Proceedings of the Combustion Institute.

Sunderland's awards include Fellow of The Combustion Institute, the National Science Foundation Faculty Early Career Award, the SAE International Ralph H. Isbrandt Automotive Safety Engineering Award, and the Poole and Kent Teaching Award.
