= Journal of Propulsion and Power =

Peer-reviewed scientific research journal covering aerospace propulsion and power

- Discipline: Propulsion
- Language: English
- Edited by: Joseph M. Powers

Publication details
- History: 1985–present
- Publisher: American Institute of Aeronautics and Astronautics
- Frequency: Bimonthly
- Impact factor: 2.8 (2025)

Standard abbreviations
- ISO 4: J. Propuls. Power

Indexing
- CODEN: JPPOEL
- ISSN: 0748-4658 (print); 1533-3876 (web)
- LCCN: 91641410
- OCLC no.: 10947338

Links
- Journal homepage; Online access; Online archive

The Journal of Propulsion and Power is a bimonthly peer-reviewed scientific journal covering research on aerospace propulsion and power. The editor-in-chief is Joseph M. Powers (University of Notre Dame). It is published by the American Institute of Aeronautics and Astronautics and was established in 1985.

== Abstracting and indexing ==
The journal is abstracted and indexed in:

- Aquatic Sciences and Fisheries Abstracts
- Ei Compendex
- Inspec
- ProQuest databases
- Science Citation Index Expanded
- Scopus

According to the Journal Citation Reports, the journal has a 2024 impact factor of 2.4.

== See also ==
- AIAA Journal
- Combustion Science and Technology
- Combustion and Flame
- Proceedings of the Combustion Institute
- Progress in Energy and Combustion Science
