= Nedunchezhian Swaminathan =

Indian-born mechanical engineer

Nedunchezhian Swaminathan FREng FIMechE FRAeS
- Born: India
- Education: PSG College of Technology (B.E.); Indian Institute of Science (M.E.); University of Colorado Boulder (PhD)
- Known for: Turbulent combustion, Hydrogen flames, Numerical simulations of reacting flows
- Awards: Fellow of the Royal Academy of Engineering (2025); Fellow of the Institution of Mechanical Engineers (2024); Fellow of the Royal Aeronautical Society (2024); Sugden Award (2011, 2023, 2024)
- Scientific career
- Fields: Mechanical engineering, Combustion, Thermo-fluids, Computational fluid dynamics
- Workplaces: University of Cambridge

Nedunchezhian Swaminathan is an Indian-born mechanical engineer, combustion scientist and academic. He serves as the Professor of Mechanical Engineering at the University of Cambridge and is the Director of Studies and a Fellow at Robinson College, Cambridge.

Swaminathan's research specializes in thermo-fluids, computational fluid dynamics (CFD), and combustion. His work focuses on the numerical simulation of reacting flows, particularly regarding turbulent combustion and the utilization of hydrogen and other low-carbon fuels.

In recognition of his contributions to engineering and combustion science, Swaminathan was elected a Fellow of the Royal Academy of Engineering in 2025. He is also a Fellow of the Institution of Mechanical Engineers, the Royal Aeronautical Society, the American Society of Mechanical Engineers, the Combustion Institute, and the DIRDI.

== Early life and education ==
Swaminathan received a B.E. in Mechanical Engineering from PSG College of Technology, India in 1987, and an M.E. in Aerospace Engineering from the Indian Institute of Science in1989. He earned his PhD in Mechanical Engineering from the University of Colorado Boulder in 1994.

== Career ==
Following his doctoral studies, Swaminathan worked as a Research Associate and Fellow in the Department of Mechanical Engineering at the University of Sydney from 1995 to 2000. He subsequently held engineering and consulting positions at the GE India Technology Centre and Tata Consultancy Services before joining the University of Cambridge in 2003. At Cambridge, he has served as a University Lecturer (2003–2011), Reader in Mechanical Engineering (2011–2013), and has been Professor of Mechanical Engineering since 2013. He is also Director of Studies at Robinson College, Cambridge.

== Research ==
Swaminathan’s research covers thermo-fluids, turbulent combustion, hydrogen and low-carbon fuel combustion, Computational fluid dynamics, and the modelling of reacting flows. His research group was among the first to use Direct numerical simulation (DNS) to investigate MILD combustion (moderate or intense low-oxygen dilution combustion), demonstrating that ignition fronts, lean and rich premixed flames, and non-premixed combustion coexist within this regime. Their work showed that the lean premixed mode is dominant, while the contribution of non-premixed combustion increases as the dilution level rises with decreasing mean oxygen concentration, establishing MILD combustion as an ultra-low-emission, low-noise, thermo-acoustically stable, and high-efficiency combustion technology.

A significant part of his research has focused on hydrogen and hydrogen-blended flames, including flame structure, preferential diffusion effects, lifted jet flames, and combustion under gas-turbine-relevant conditions.

He has also worked on MILD combustion, machine-learning-assisted modelling of filtered density functions, and reaction-rate closures for LES of turbulent reacting flows.

Swaminathan has led or contributed to numerous national and international projects funded by the EPSRC, Horizon Europe, the Royal Society, and the European Commission, as well as industrial partners including Mitsubishi Heavy Industries, Siemens, Rolls-Royce, GE, Bergen Engines, and Ricardo. He has also received substantial allocations of high-performance computing resources for DNS and LES studies of turbulent reacting flows and hydrogen combustion.

== Selected publications ==
=== Books ===
- Swaminathan, N.; Parente, A. (2023). Machine Learning and its Application to Reacting Flows. Springer Nature. ISBN 978-3-031-16247-3.
- Swaminathan, N.; Bai, X.-S.; Haugen, N. E. L.; Fureby, C.; Brethouwer, G. (2021). Advanced Turbulent Combustion Physics and Applications. Cambridge University Press. ISBN 9781108497961.
- Swaminathan, N.; Bray, K.N.C. (2011). Turbulent Premixed Flames. Cambridge University Press. ISBN 9780521769617.

=== Selected articles ===
- Swaminathan, N.; Bilger, R. W. (1999). "Assessment of combustion sub-models for turbulent nonpremixed hydrocarbon flames". Combustion and Flame. 116: 519–545.
- Swaminathan, N.; Bray, K.N.C. (2005). "Effect of dilatation on scalar dissipation in turbulent premixed flames". Combustion and Flame. 143 (4): 549–565.
- Kolla, H.; Swaminathan, N. (2010). "Strained flamelets for turbulent premixed flames, I: formulation and planar flame results". Combustion and Flame. 157: 943–954.

== Awards and honours ==
- Fellow of the Royal Academy of Engineering (2025)
- Fellow of the Institution of Mechanical Engineers (2024)
- Fellow of the American Society of Mechanical Engineers (2024)
- Fellow of the Royal Aeronautical Society (2024)
- Fellow, Combustion Institute (2018)
- Sugden Award, The Combustion Institute (2011, 2023, 2024)
- Fellow of the Robinson College, Cambridge
