= Brian Street =

British anthropologist (1943–2017)

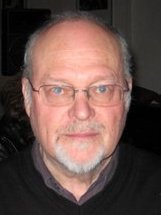
- Street in 2013
- Born: 24 October 1943; Manchester, England
- Died: 21 June 2017 (aged 73); Hove, England
- Education: University of Oxford
- Occupation: Anthropologist
- Notable work: Literacy in Theory and Practice (1984)

Brian Vincent Street (24 October 1943 – 21 June 2017) was a British academic and anthropologist, who was professor of language education at King's College London and visiting professor at the Graduate School of Education in University of Pennsylvania. During his career, he mainly worked on literacy in both theoretical and applied perspectives, and is perhaps best known for his book Literacy in Theory and Practice (1984).

== Biography ==
Born in Manchester, England, to Dorothy Groves, a woman from a Russian Jewish background, Street was told his father, an Irish pilot, had died in action during the war. Street was adopted by Margaret Nellie Street and Harry Street; the family moved to Devon in 1945. The elder Street found work in a wool factory, where his adopted son suffered a serious eye injury at the age of 18.

Street was educated at the Christian Brothers Grammar School in Plymouth and read English and, for his doctorate, Anthropology at Oxford University; his PhD was supervised by Godfrey Lienhardt. In 1971, he took up a lectureship at the Mashhad University. From 1974, he taught social and cultural anthropology at the University of Sussex, assuming a post as Professor of Language and Education at King's College London and for more than fifteen years he supervised doctoral students and taught graduate workshops on ethnography, student writing in higher education and language and literacy at King's. He spent six months at the University of Pennsylvania in 1988, leading to a permanent appointment as a visiting professor in the Graduate School of Education. His summer schools at the Federal University of Minas Gerais in Belo Horizonte, Brazil continued until shortly before he died. He retired from his full-time post at KCL in 2010. Meanwhile, he continued an association with Sussex University, via the Mass-Observation archive housed there and research with Dorothy Sheridan.

In 2009, he was elected vice-president of the Royal Anthropological Institute (RAI) and he was Chair of the Education Committee of the RAI since 2006. Later in his career, he became involved in development projects in South Asia and Africa using ethnographic perspectives in training literacy and numeracy teachers in a programme known as LETTER (Learning Empowerment through Training in Ethnographic Research). He also worked with colleagues in Brazil with particular interest in ethnographic and academic literacies perspectives. A collection of papers (coedited with Judy Kalman) concerning Latin America was published in 2012.

== Academic work ==
Street became one of the leading theoreticians within what has come to be known as New Literacy Studies (NLS), in which literacy is seen not just as a set of technical skills, but as a social practice that is embedded in power relations. Street developed his theory in opposition to leading literacy scholars at the time, including Jack Goody and Walter J. Ong. These, and other scholars, represented what Street called an "autonomous view of literacy", in which literacy is as a set of autonomous skills that can be learnt independently of the social context. The alternative view Street called "ideological", since it acknowledges literacy's context-dependent and power-laden nature.

Central to Street's conceptualisation of literacy was the distinction between literacy events and literacy practices. The term literacy events was coined by Shirley Brice Heath to refer to situations in which people engage with reading or writing. While literacy events refers to discrete situations, literacy practices refers to the larger systems which these events create within a community. Literacy practices are the patterns of literacy events in a society; different domains may have different literacy practices, as literacy has different functions within a society, across domains. Street defined literacy practices as the "broader cultural conception of particular ways of thinking about and doing reading and writing in cultural contexts."

The notion of literacy practices stems from Street's fieldwork in an Iranian mountain village, Cheshmeh, where he realised that people used literacy in different ways in different contexts, and for different purposes: maktab, schooled and commercial literacy practices. The uses and meanings of these were different: maktab literacy was associated with Koranic schools, schooled literacy with secularisation and modernisation, and commercial literacy with the fruit trade. The commercial literacy sprang out of the Koranic literacy practices, rather than schooled literacy practices as the dominant view of Literacy might expect and Street explains this by the status and authority the latter practice had within the village. Schooled literacy, on the other hand, although more technically developed, was oriented away from the village towards the cities. It was not the literacy skills as such, but the social functions associated with particular literacies, that influenced the development of commercial literacy in this village.

Later in his career, Street worked on academic literacy and numeracy, and both areas can be said to reflect and build on his view of literacy. In several articles on academic literacy (most co-authored with Mary R. Lea), Street critiques the notion of academic literacy as a set of skills to give writings structure, content and clarity, and argues that this varies across disciplines, and that what is seen as "appropriate writing" is more closely tied to epistemologies and the underlying assumptions of different disciplines. The perspective of academic literacies acknowledges and takes into account the power and discourses within institutions and institutional production and representation of meaning.

Street (and his co-authors Dave Baker and Alison Tomlin) saw numeracy, like literacy, as a social practice that cannot be reduced to a set of technical skills. Rather, they turn the focus to social factors, particularly the similarities or differences between school and home numeracy practices, and the implications of these, including ideology, power relations, values, and social institutions. Street (and his co-authors) argued that some maths practices are privileged over others, and this has to do with the control and status associated with social institutions and procedures. In that sense, we can adopt a similar approach to numeracy practices as social and ideological that has been developed with regard to literacy.

== Personal life and honours ==
Street married twice, first to Joanna Lowry, whom he met while an academic at Sussex University. The couple had three now adult children, a son and two daughters, before separating in 1991. His second wife was Maria Lucia Castanheira, a professor at Brazil's Federal University of Minas Gerais, whom he married in 2017.

Street was awarded the National Reading Conference's Distinguished Scholar Lifetime Achievement Award in 2008.

== Death ==
Brian Street died in Hove, East Sussex, on 21 June 2017 at the age of 73 from cancer.

== Selected books ==
- Grenfell, Michael (2012). Language, ethnography, and education : bridging new literacy studies and Bourdieu. New York, NY: Routledge. ISBN 9780415872485.
- Heath, Shirley Brice (2008). On ethnography: approaches to language and literacy research. New York: Teachers College Press : NCRLL/National Conference on Research in Language and Literacy. ISBN 9780807748664.
- Students writing in the university: cultural and epistemological issues. Studies in written language and literacy. Amsterdam; Philadelphia: John Benjamins Pub. 1999. ISBN 9027218013.
- Kalman, Judy; B. V. Street (2012). Literacy and numeracy in Latin America: local perspectives and beyond. New York: Routledge. ISBN 9780415896092.
- Sheridan, Dorothy (2000). Writing ourselves: mass-observation and literacy practices. Language & social processes. Cresskill, N.J: Hampton Press. ISBN 1572732776.
- Street, Brian V. (1984). Literacy in theory and practice. NY: Cambridge University Press.
- Street, Brian V.; B. M. Kroll (1988). "Cross-cultural perspectives on literacy". In E. R. Kintgen; M. Rose (eds.). Perspectives on literacy. Carbondale, IL: Southern Illinois University Press. pp. 139–150.
- Street, Brian V. (1995). Adult Literacy in the United Kingdom: A History of Research and Practice. Citeseer.
- Street, Brian V. (1995). Social literacies: Critical approaches to literacy in development, ethnography and education. London: Longman.
- Literacy and development: Ethnographic perspectives. Brian V. Street (ed.). London and New York: Routledge. 2001.
- Literacies across educational contexts: Mediating learning and teaching. Brian V. Street (ed.). Philadelphia: Caslon Publishing. 2005.
- Street, Brian V. (2005). Navigating numeracies: home/school numeracy practices. Multiple perspectives on attainment in numeracy. Dordrecht, Netherlands: Springer. ISBN 1402036760.
- Street, Brian V.; D. Bloome; K. Pahl (2012). "LETTER: Learning for Empowerment through Training in Ethnographic-style Research". In M. Grenfell; C. Hardy, J. Rowsell (eds.). Language, Ethnography, and Education: Bridging New Literacy Studies and Bourdieu. New York and London: Routledge. pp. 73–88.

== Selected articles and book chapters ==
- Street, Brian V. (1993). "The new literacy studies, guest editorial". Journal of Research in Reading. 16 (2): 81–97. doi:10.1111/j.1467-9817.1993.tb00039.x.
- Street, Brian V.; L. Thompson (1993). "Culture is a verb: Anthropological aspects of language and cultural process". In D. Graddol; M. Byram (eds.). Language and culture. Clevedon, UK: BAAL in association with Multilingual Matters. pp. 23–43.
- Street, Brian V. (1997). "The Implications of the 'New Literacy Studies' for Literacy Education". English in Education. 31 (3): 45–59. doi:10.1111/j.1754-8845.1997.tb00133.x.
- Street, Brian V. (1999). "Academic Literacies". In Carys Jones; Brian V. Street (eds.). Students Writing in the University: Cultural and epistemological issues. Amsterdam and Philadelphia: John Benjamins Publishing Company. pp. 193–227.
- Street, Brian V. (2003). "What's "new" in New Literacy Studies? Critical approaches to literacy in theory and practice". Current Issues in Comparative Education. 5 (2): 77–91.
- Street, Brian V. (2003). "The limits of the local 'autonomous' or 'disembedding'". International Journal of Learning. 10: 2825–2830.
- Street, Brian V. (2004). "Futures of the ethnography of literacy?". Language and Education. 18 (4): 326–330. doi:10.1080/09500780408666885. S2CID 144436705.
- Street, Brian V. (2004). "Thoughts on anthropology and education". Anthropology Today. 20 (6): 1–2. doi:10.1111/j.0268-540x.2004.00308.x.
- Street, Brian V. (2005). "The hidden dimensions of mathematical language and literacy". Language and Education. 19 (2): 135–140. doi:10.1080/09500780508668669. S2CID 143495132.
- Street, Brian V. (2005). "At last: Recent applications of new literacy studies in educational contexts". Research in the Teaching of English. 39 (4): 417–423. doi:10.58680/rte20054482.
- Street, Brian V. (2005). "Applying New Literacy Studies to numeracy as social practice". Urban Literacy: Communication, Identity and Learning in Development Contexts. Hamburg: UNESCO Institute for Education: 87–96.
- Street, Brian V. (2012). "Society Reschooling". Reading Research Quarterly. 47 (2): 216–227. doi:10.1002/RRQ.017.
- Street, Brian V.; Alan Rogers; Dave Baker (2006). "Adult teachers as researchers: ethnographic approaches to numeracy and literacy as social practices in South Asia". Convergence. 39 (1): 31.
- Street, Joanna C.; Brian V. Street; M. Briggs; M. Selinger (1995). "The schooling of literacy". In J. Bourne; P. Murphy (eds.). Subject learning in the primary curriculum: Issues in English, science, and math. London: Routledge. pp. 75–88.
