= Morris Sugden =

British chemist

Sir Theodore Morris Sugden CBE FRS
- Sir (Theodore) Morris Sugden © Gonville & Caius College, Cambridge
- Born: 31 December 1919; Triangle, England
- Died: 3 January 1984 (aged 64); Addenbrooke’s Hospital, Cambridge, England
- Education: Sowerby Bridge and District Secondary School
- Alma mater: Jesus College, Cambridge
- Spouse: Marian Florence Cotton
- Children: Andrew Morris
- Awards: See list
- Scientific career
- Institutions: Cambridge University; Shell Thornton Research Centre; Master of Trinity Hall, Cambridge

Sir Theodore Morris Sugden FRS, (31 December 1919 – 3 January 1984) was a British chemist who specialised in combustion research.

== Biography ==
Theodore Morris Sugden (Morris) was born in the village of Triangle, the only child of Florence (née Chadwick) and Frederick Morris Sugden, a clerk in a mill. After attending Sowerby Bridge and District Secondary School he gained an open scholarship to Jesus College, Cambridge in 1938, where he read chemistry and was awarded a First in 1940. That year he began research under physicist W C Price on the measurement of precise ionization potentials of molecules. He later switched to working with R G W Norrish for war-work on the suppression of gun flash.

Sugden’s later research activities were in the fields of flame studies, flame photometry, ionization in flames, and microwave spectroscopy.

=== Appointments ===
- University Demonstrator in Physical Chemistry, 1946
- Humphrey Owen Jones Lecturer in Physical Chemistry, 1950
- Reader in Physical Chemistry, 1960
- Director of Research at the Shell Thornton Research Centre, near Chester, 1964
- Director of Thornton Research Centre, 1967
- Chief Executive of Shell Research Limited, 1974-1975
- Master of Trinity Hall, Cambridge, 1976

=== Awards and honours ===
- Elected to the Royal Society, 1963
- Awarded an honorary D Tech. by University of Bradford, 1967
- Awarded an honorary doctorate of science by York University, Ontario, 1973
- Made a CBE, 1975
- Received the Davy Medal, 1975
- Awarded an honorary doctorate of science by University of Liverpool, 1977
- Awarded an honorary doctorate of science by University of Leeds, 1978
- He was an Honorary Fellow of Jesus and Queens' Colleges, Cambridge.
- Elected a Corresponding Member of the Göttingen Academy of Sciences and Humanities, 1975.
- Chairman of the Combustion Institute Committee, 1970–1982, and an International Vice-President, 1974–1982.
- President of the Chemical Society, 1978-1979
- Physical Secretary of the Royal Society, 1978-1984
- Knighted in the New Year Honours List, 1983

=== Family ===
Sugden married Marian Florence Cotton in 1945. They had one child, Andrew Morris, born in 1954. He graduated from Oxford in Botany in 1975, and later gained a doctorate in tropical rainforest ecology. He undertook an expedition to the Serranía de Macuira in northern Colombia, publishing a checklist to the plants of this area along with Enrique Forero. He has subsequently followed an editorial career.

Sir Theodore Morris Sugden died at Addenbrooke's Hospital, Cambridge on 3 January 1984; he was cremated in Cambridge on the 10th. The Sugden Award for combustion research is named in his honour.

Lady Marian Sugden died in December 2009.

Academic offices
Preceded by William Alexander Deer	Master of Trinity Hall, Cambridge; 1975 to 1984	Succeeded by Sir John Lyons
