= Kenneth Bray =

British engineer and academic

- Born: Kenneth Noel Corbett Bray
- Known for: Bray–Moss–Libby model
- Awards: FRS
- Scientific career
- Institutions: University of Cambridge

Kenneth Noel Corbett Bray FRS is emeritus professor at University of Cambridge.

== Life ==
He was editor of Combustion and Flame from 1981 to 1986.

== Works ==
- "Studies of the Turbulent Burning Velocity", K. N. C. Bray, Proceedings: Mathematical and Physical Sciences, Vol. 431, No. 1882 (8 November 1990), pp. 315–335
- Nedunchezhian Swaminathan; Kenneth Bray, eds. (2011). Turbulent Premixed Flames. Cambridge University Press. ISBN 978-0-521-76961-7.
