= Philip Broadbridge =

Philip Broadbridge is an Australian mathematician and emeritus professor at La Trobe University whose research focuses on applied mathematics, nonlinear partial differential equations and mathematical modelling. He served as director of the Australian Mathematical Sciences Institute and was awarded the ANZIAM Medal in 2022.

== Education and career ==
Broadbridge studied at the University of Adelaide, where he received a Bachelor of Science with honours and later a Doctor of Philosophy degree. He also completed a Diploma of Education at the University of Tasmania. He was appointed a professor in 1991. He retired from La Trobe in 2019 and currently held the position of emeritus professor.

In 2015, he established the Australian branch of the Institute of Mathematics for Industry at Kyushu University at La Trobe University and served on its International Advisory Board.

He has also held editorial positions with the ANZIAM Journal, Applied Mathematical Modelling, Entropy, International Journal of Mathematics for Industry and Proceedings of the Royal Society.

== Research ==
Broadbridge's research concerns mathematical methods for nonlinear differential equations and their applications. He has developed exact and symmetry-based methods for obtaining solutions to nonlinear boundary-value problems. One of his work is the Broadbridge–White model for unsaturated water flow, an exactly solvable nonlinear model used in hydrological modelling.
