= IMFT =

IMFT may refer to:

- IM Flash Technologies, a semiconductor company founded in 2006, by Intel Corporation and Micron Technology, Inc.
- Institut de Mécanique des Fluides de Toulouse, a joint research laboratory founded in 1920, specializing the physics of flows.
- Integrated Marriage and Family Therapist, a professional license which focuses on psychotherapy, treating mental health issues and focusing on the dynamics of relationships and interactions within families and marriages
