= Chemical Engineering Science =

- Discipline: Chemical engineering
- Language: English
- Edited by: A.P.J. Middelberg

Publication details
- History: 1951-present
- Publisher: Elsevier
- Frequency: 24/year
- Open access: Hybrid
- Impact factor: 4.889 (2021)

Standard abbreviations
- ISO 4: Chem. Eng. Sci.

Indexing
- CODEN: CESCAC
- ISSN: 0009-2509
- LCCN: 56034685
- OCLC no.: 781521624

Links
- Journal homepage; Online access

Chemical Engineering Science is a peer-reviewed scientific journal covering all aspects of chemical engineering. It is published by Elsevier and was established in 1951. While the journal aims to publish "outstanding research that has as its foundations the Science of Chemical Engineering", it has focuses on the themes of catalysis, green and sustainable science, and environmental and novel materials.

The journal publishes full-length research papers, short communications, review articles, and letters to the editors. It offers the choice to publish under both the open access and subscription modes, and follows a single anonymized review process.

A related journal, Chemical Engineering Science: X, was discontinued in 2023.

== Abstracting and indexing ==
The journal is abstracted and indexed in:

- BIOSIS
- Chemical Abstracts
- Current Contents/Engineering, Computing & Technology
- Science Citation Index
- Ei Compendex
- FLUIDEX
- Inspec
- PASCAL
- Scopus

According to the Journal Citation Reports, the journal has a 2019 impact factor of 3.871.
