= Katharina Kohse-Höinghaus =

German chemist

Katharina Kohse-Höinghaus (born 18 December 1951) is a German chemist.

== Life ==
Kohse-Höinghaus studied Chemistry at the Ruhr University Bochum from 1970 to 1975. She finished her doctorate at the Ruhr University Bochum in 1978 and her habilitation at the University of Stuttgart in 1992. Since 1994, she is a professor for physical chemistry at the Bielefeld University. She founded one of the first hands-on laboratories for schools. She served as the President of The Combustion Institute between 2012 and 2016.

== Research ==
Her research focuses on combustion diagnostics using laser spectroscopy and mass spectrometry, the deposition of functional materials from the gas-phase, and the in-situ analysis of reactive systems.

== Awards and memberships ==
She received the following awards and memberships:

- Order of Merit of the Federal Republic of Germany in 2007
- Member of the Academy of Sciences Leopoldina since 2008
- Member of the German Council of Science and Humanities since 2012
- Member of the acatech since 2015
- Member of the Göttingen Academy of Sciences and Humanities since 2016
- Member of the North Rhine-Westphalian Academy of Sciences, Humanities and the Arts since 2017
- Member of the European Academy of Sciences and Arts since 2017
- Fellow of The Combustion Institute since 2018
- Walther Nernst Memorial Medal by the Deutsche Bunsen-Gesellschaft für Physikalische Chemie in 2020
- Member of the Chinese Academy of Sciences since 2021
