= Jacqueline O'Connor =

American mechanical engineer

Jacqueline O'Connor is an American mechanical engineer whose research concerns the fluid dynamics in combustion, including the experimental observation of reacting flows using high-speed lasers, and decarbonization of carbon-intensive industries. She is a professor of mechanical engineer at Pennsylvania State University, where she heads the Reacting Flow Dynamics Laboratory.

== Education and career ==
O'Connor graduated from the Massachusetts Institute of Technology in 2006 with a bachelor's degree in aeronautics. She went on to graduate study in aerospace engineering at Georgia Tech, where she received a master's degree in 2009 and completed her Ph.D. in 2012.

She joined the Pennsylvania State University faculty after postdoctoral research at Sandia National Laboratories. She is also affiliated with the Penn State Institute of Energy and the Environment, and an associate director of the Penn State Climate Consortium.

== Recognition ==
O'Connor was named as an ASME Fellow in the 2020 class of fellows; she is also an associate fellow of the American Institute of Aeronautics and Astronautics. She was one of two recipients of the Hiroshi Tsuji Early Career Researcher Award of the Combustion Institute.

In 2024, she received the Penn State Alumni/Student Award for Excellence in Teaching and was named as a Penn State Teaching Fellow.
