= Applied Mathematical Modelling =

Scientific Journal

- Discipline: Mathematical modeling
- Language: English
- Edited by: Johann Sienz

Publication details
- History: Since 1976
- Publisher: Elsevier
- Frequency: Monthly
- Impact factor: 5.1 (2024)

Standard abbreviations
- ISO 4: Appl. Math. Model.

Indexing
- ISSN: 0307-904X

Links
- Journal homepage

Applied Mathematical Modelling is a scientific journal published by Elsevier, focusing on applied mathematics with an emphasis on mathematical modeling in engineering, environmental processes, manufacturing, and industrial systems. The journal was established as a quarterly journal in 1976 by IPC Science and Technology Press with Christopher J. Rawlins as managing editor. The journal is currently published by Elsevier on a monthly basis, and is edited by Johann Sienz (Swansea University).

== Abstracting and indexing ==
The journal is indexed and abstracted in the following bibliographic databases:

- CAD/CAM Abstracts
- COMPENDEX
- Computer & Control Abstracts
- Current Contents - Engineering, Computing & Technology
- Electronics and Communications Abstracts
- Embase
- FLUIDEX
- INSPEC
- Mathematical Reviews
- Science Citation Index Expanded
- Scopus
- Web of Science
- Zentralblatt MATH
