= Dorothy Sheridan =

British archivist (born 1948)

Dorothy Sheridan MBE
- Born: 1948 (age 77–78); Galway, Ireland
- Education: University of Sussex
- Occupations: Archivist and historian
- Years active: 1974–present
- Known for: Director of the Mass Observation Archive (1990–2010)

Dorothy Sheridan (born 1948) is a British archivist and historian, who was the Director of the Mass Observation Archive (MOA) from 1990 to 2008. She is a Trustee of the MOA and an Honorary Professor of History at the University of Sussex.

== Personal life and early studies ==
Dorothy Elizabeth Sheridan was born in Galway, on the west coast of Ireland, but moved to the Yorkshire Dales when she was two with her parents, John J. Sheridan and Moyra F. Sheridan. She grew up there in cottages with outside toilets and no running water. Her parents were active campaigners in the Campaign for Nuclear Disarmament and took Sheridan to demonstrations and protests.

Sheridan attended Harrogate Grammar School (1959 until 1964), Beverley High School for Girls (1964–1966) and Hull College of Commerce (1966–1967). She obtained eight O-levels and four A-levels. She then went to Brighton in 1967, where she studied Sociology in the School of Education at the University of Sussex.

Sheridan married psychologist and fellow socialist Anthony Wainwright, in Lewes, East Sussex, in 1968. Their son, Luke Anthony, was born in Edinburgh in 1972. She married Barry Stierer in 1996.

== Mass Observation Archive ==
Tom Harrisson offered Sheridan a temporary job in 1974, working to establish the Mass Observation papers as a history resource. This job became permanent, with Sheridan acting as the first archivist. She performed a variety of jobs there, beginning by labelling boxes and telephoning Harrisson with updates and moving on to develop and promote the archive. In 1976, Harrisson had given her money to buy a car and learn to drive so that she could chauffeur him when he visited, but he died before this happened so she purchased a motorbike instead.

In 1981, Sheridan co-founded the launch of the contemporary phase of Mass Observation, the Mass Observation Project that collects new material about everyday life. She combined the management of the Mass Observation Archive (MOA) with research, writing and publishing, and travelled extensively to promote Mass Observation, autobiographical writing and ethical archiving.

Sheridan became Director of the MOA in 1990. She acted as researcher and consultant on the digital resources developing from the archive, and had to adjust to tasks such as electronic research support within the University of Sussex, which took her away from her main interests in life history research and archiving.

In 2010, Sheridan retired from her role as Director, but continued her involvement as a Trustee of the MOA.

=== Publications ===
Sheridan has written and co-authored a number of books, largely involving Mass Observation materials.

- Speak for Yourself: Mass Observation Anthology, 1937–49 (with Angus Calder, 1984).
- Among You Taking Notes (1985).
- Mass Observation at the Movies (1987).
- Wartime Women: A Mass Observation Anthology (1990).
- Writing Ourselves: Mass-Observation and Literacy Practices (with Brian Street & David Bloome, 2000).
- "The Mass Observation Archive: A History", Mass Observation Online (2009).

== Other roles and activities since 2010 ==
Sheridan became the Head of Special Collections at Sussex in 2000, working in this role until retiring in 2008.

Sheridan is an advisor to the National Life Stories project at the British Library and acted as consultant on the "Observing the Eighties" project, which brought together materials from the Life Stories and MOA.

Sheridan was a member of the management committee of community publishing group QueenSpark Books between 1996 and 2010, and continues to be involved in their work as a patron.

In her retirement, Sheridan has developed her political interests, continuing in her solidarity work for Palestine, which began after a first visit to Palestine in 2004. She remains a committed and active socialist and feminist. In 2016, Sheridan obtained a qualification in Teaching English to Speakers of Other Languages (TESOL) and has re-directed her interest in language and life stories towards working with migrants and refugees. She teaches English in Brighton at the Migrant English Project. She is also a member of the Gatwick Detainees Welfare Group and visits people on immigration detention at the Gatwick Immigration Removal Centre.

== Honours and awards ==
Sheridan was appointed an MBE in 1991. She was also elected Fellow of the Royal Society of Arts.

The Open University awarded Sheridan an honorary doctorate, which she described as her "career high", in 2007.

In 2011, the University of Sussex made Sheridan a 50th Anniversary Fellow. She is also an Honorary Professor at the University, where she co-founded the Life History Research Centre.

Sheridan is Visiting Professor at the University of Brighton, where she is on the advisory board of the Centre for Memory, History and Narratives.
