= Combustion and Flame =

- Discipline: Combustion
- Language: English
- Edited by: Fokion Egolfopoulos, Thierry Poinsot

Publication details
- History: 1957-present
- Publisher: Elsevier
- Frequency: Monthly
- Impact factor: 5.8 (2023)

Standard abbreviations
- ISO 4: Combust. Flame

Indexing
- CODEN: CBFMAO
- ISSN: 0010-2180 (print); 1556-2921 (web)
- LCCN: 59001555
- OCLC no.: 758103070

Links
- Journal homepage; Online access

Combustion and Flame is a monthly peer-reviewed scientific journal published by Elsevier on behalf of the Combustion Institute. It covers fundamental research on combustion science. The editors-in-chief are Fokion Egolfopoulos (University of Southern California) and Thierry Poinsot (Centre National de la Recherche Scientifique).

== Abstracting and indexing ==
The journal is abstracted and indexed in:

- Cambridge Scientific Abstracts
- Current Contents/Engineering, Computing & Technology
- EI/Compendex Plus
- Embase
- Inspec
- PASCAL
- Science Citation Index
- Scopus

According to the Journal Citation Reports, the journal has a 2020 impact factor of 4.185, ranking it 9th out of 60 in the category of Thermodynamics.

== See also ==
- Combustion Science and Technology
- Combustion Theory and Modelling
- Proceedings of the Combustion Institute
- Progress in Energy and Combustion Science
- AIAA Journal
- Journal of Propulsion and Power
