= Alison Tomlin =

British physical chemist and applied mathematician

Alison Sarah Tomlin is a British physical chemist and applied mathematician whose research involves building detailed mathematical models of combustion, including uncertainty quantification for those models. She is a professor in the School of Chemical and Process Engineering at the University of Leeds, where she heads the Clean Combustion Research Group.

== Education and career ==
Tomlin was a student of mathematics and of the history of science and philosophy of science at the University of Leeds, where she earned a combined bachelor's degree in those topics in 1987. She continued at Leeds as a graduate student in physical chemistry, completing her dissertation Bifurcation analysis for non-linear chemical kinetics in 1990.

After earning her doctorate, and performing post-doctoral research at Leeds and Princeton University, she returned to Leeds as a lecturer in the Department of Fuel and Energy in 1994.

== Book ==
With Tamás Turányi, Tomlin is coauthor of the book Analysis of Kinetic Reaction Mechanisms (Springer, 2014).

== Recognition ==
A paper coauthored by Tomlin won the 1992 Sugden Award of The Combustion Institute. Tomlin was elected to the inaugural 2018 class of Fellows of The Combustion Institute, "for innovative research on the development and application of mechanism reduction, sensitivity analysis and uncertainty quantification in combustion models".
