= AIAA Journal =

- Discipline: Astronautics and aeronautics
- Language: English
- Edited by: Tom I-P. Shih

Publication details
- History: AIAA Journal (1963–present); Journal of the Aerospace Sciences (1958–1962); Journal of the Aeronautical Sciences (1934–1957)
- Publisher: American Institute of Aeronautics and Astronautics (Monthly)
- Impact factor: 2.5 (2022)

Standard abbreviations
- ISO 4: AIAA J.

Indexing
- CODEN: AIAJAH
- ISSN: 0001-1452 (print); 1533-385X (web)
- LCCN: 64004358
- OCLC no.: 809393

Links
- Journal homepage; Online archive

The AIAA Journal is a peer-reviewed scientific journal published monthly by the American Institute of Aeronautics and Astronautics. It covers all areas of aeronautics and astronautics, particularly with respect to new theoretical and experimental developments. The current editor-in-chief is Tom I-P. Shih from Purdue University. According to the Journal Citation Reports, its 2020 impact factor is 2.127, ranking it 8th out of 34 journals in the category "Engineering, Aerospace".

== History ==
The history of the AIAA Journal is linked with the development of the American Institute of Aeronautics and Astronautics. In 1933, a predecessor organization called the Institute of the Aeronautical Sciences first published the Journal of the Aeronautical Sciences. This journal was published on a monthly basis beginning in 1935. The American Rocket Society was founded and began to publish in roughly the same time frame, with their main publication titled The Journal of the American Rocket Society. By the late 1950s, both organizations shared similar topics. The AIAA and ARS officially merged in 1963, which led to the consolidation of their flagship journals into the AIAA Journal in 1963.

== See also ==
- Journal of Propulsion and Power
- Combustion Science and Technology
- Combustion and Flame
- Proceedings of the Combustion Institute
- Progress in Energy and Combustion Science
