= Bray–Moss–Libby model =

Closure model for a scalar field

In premixed turbulent combustion, Bray–Moss–Libby (BML) model is a closure model for a scalar field, built on the assumption that the reaction sheet is infinitely thin compared with the turbulent scales, so that the scalar can be found either at the state of burnt gas or unburnt gas. The model is named after Kenneth Bray, J. B. Moss and Paul A. Libby.

== Mathematical description ==
Let us define a non-dimensional scalar variable or progress variable $c$ such that $c=0$ at the unburnt mixture and $c=1$ at the burnt gas side. For example, if $T_u$ is the unburnt gas temperature and $T_b$ is the burnt gas temperature, then the non-dimensional temperature can be defined as

$$c=\frac{T-T_u}{T_b-T_u}.$$

The progress variable could be any scalar, i.e., we could have chosen the concentration of a reactant as a progress variable. Since the reaction sheet is infinitely thin, at any point in the flow field, we can find the value of $c$ to be either unity or zero. The transition from zero to unity occurs instantaneously at the reaction sheet. Therefore, the probability density function for the progress variable is given by

$$P(c,\mathbf{x},t) = \alpha(\mathbf{x},t)\delta(c) + \beta(\mathbf{x},t)\delta(1-c)$$

where $\alpha(\mathbf{x},t)$ and $\beta(\mathbf{x},t)$ are the probability of finding unburnt and burnt mixture, respectively and $\delta$ is the Dirac delta function. By definition, the normalization condition leads to

$$\alpha(\mathbf{x},t)+\beta(\mathbf{x},t)=1.$$

It can be seen that the mean progress variable,

$$\bar{c}(\mathbf{x},t) = \int_0^1 c P(c,\mathbf{x},t)\, dc = \beta(\mathbf{x},t)$$

is nothing but the probability of finding burnt gas at location $\mathbf{x}$ and at the time $t$. The density function is completely described by the mean progress variable, as we can write (suppressing the variables $\mathbf{x},t$)

$$P(c) = (1-\bar c)\delta(c) + \bar c\delta(1-c).$$

Assuming constant pressure and constant molecular weight, ideal gas law can be shown to reduce to

$$\frac{\rho}{\rho_u}=\frac{T_u}{T}=\frac{1}{1+\tau c}$$

where $\tau$ is the heat release parameter. Using the above relation, the mean density can be calculated as follows

$$\frac{\bar{\rho}}{\rho_u}=1-\beta + \frac{\beta}{1+\tau}.$$

The Favre averaging of the progress variable is given by

$$\tilde c \equiv \frac{\overline{\rho c}}{\bar\rho} = \frac{\rho_u}{\bar\rho}\frac{\beta}{1+\tau}.$$

Combining the two expressions, we find

$$\bar{c}=\beta = \frac{(1+\tau )\tilde c}{1+\tau \tilde c}$$

and hence

$$\alpha = \frac{1-\tilde c}{1+\tau \tilde c}.$$

The density average is

$$\bar\rho = \frac{\rho_u}{1+\tau \tilde c}.$$

== General density function ==
If reaction sheet is not assumed to be thin, then there is a chance that one can find a value for $c$ in between zero and unity, although in reality, the reaction sheet is mostly thin compared to turbulent scales. Nevertheless, the general form the density function can be written as

$$P(c,\mathbf{x},t) = \alpha(\mathbf{x},t)\delta(c) + \beta(\mathbf{x},t)\delta(1-c) + \gamma(\mathbf{x},t) f(c,\mathbf{x},t)$$

where $\gamma(\mathbf{x},t)$ is the probability of finding the progress variable which is undergoing reaction (where transition from zero to unity is effected). Here, we have

$$\alpha(\mathbf{x},t)+\beta(\mathbf{x},t)+\gamma(\mathbf{x},t) = 1$$

where $\gamma$ is negligible in most regions.
