= Bill Pickering (rocket scientist) =

New Zealand aerospace engineer

William H. Pickering ONZ KBE
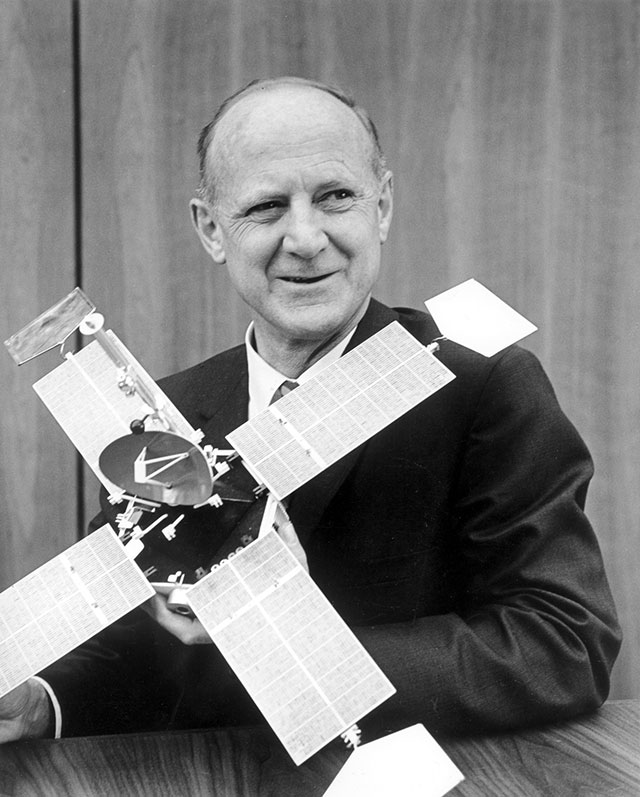
- Pickering with a model of the Mariner 4 spacecraft, c. 1965
- Born: William Hayward Pickering; 24 December 1910; Wellington, New Zealand
- Died: 15 March 2004 (aged 93); Flintridge, California, U.S.
- Citizenship: New Zealand, United States
- Known for: Space aeronautics pioneering
- Scientific career
- Workplaces: Jet Propulsion Laboratory
- Thesis: A Geiger Counter Study of the Cosmic Radiations (1936)
- Doctoral advisor: Robert A. Millikan

William Hayward Pickering ONZ KBE (24 December 1910 – 15 March 2004) was a New Zealand aerospace engineer who headed Pasadena, California's Jet Propulsion Laboratory (JPL) for 22 years, retiring in 1976. He was a senior NASA luminary and pioneered the exploration of space. Pickering was also a founding member of the United States National Academy of Engineering.

== Origins and education ==
Born in Wellington, New Zealand, on 24 December 1910, Pickering attended Havelock School (also attended by Ernest Rutherford), Marlborough, and Wellington College. After spending a year at the Canterbury University College, he moved to the United States (where he subsequently naturalized), to complete a bachelor's degree at the California Institute of Technology (Caltech), and later, in 1936, a PhD in Physics. His speciality was in Electrical Engineering, and he majored in what is now commonly known in scientific vernacular as 'telemetry'. He wrote his PhD thesis under Robert A. Millikan, who received the Nobel Prize in Physics in 1923.

== Jet Propulsion Laboratory ==
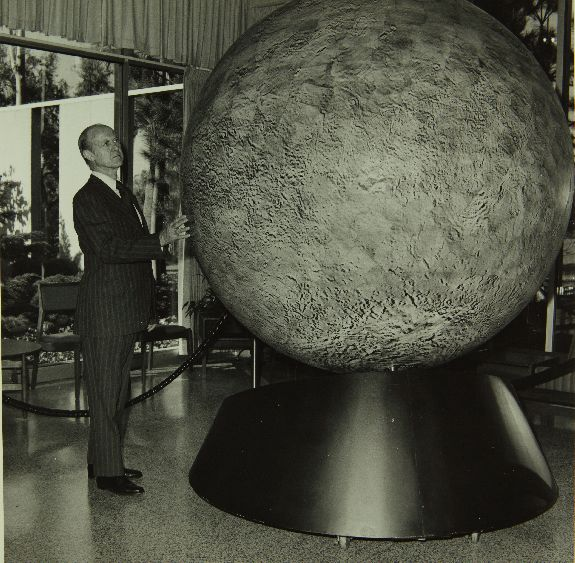
Pickering with a Moon model

William Pickering became involved with the Jet Propulsion Laboratory (JPL) in 1944, during the Second World War.

As the Director of JPL, from 1954, Pickering was closely involved with management of the Private and Corporal missiles under the aegis of the U.S. Army.

His group launched Explorer I on a Jupiter-C rocket from Cape Canaveral on 31 January 1958 less than four months after the Soviet Union had launched Sputnik.

In 1958 the lab's projects were transferred to the National Aeronautics and Space Administration (NASA) and Pickering's team concentrated on NASA's unmanned space-flight program. JPL, under Pickering's direction flew further Explorer 3 and Pioneer missions as well as the Ranger and Surveyor missions to the Moon and the several Mariner flybys of Venus and Mars.

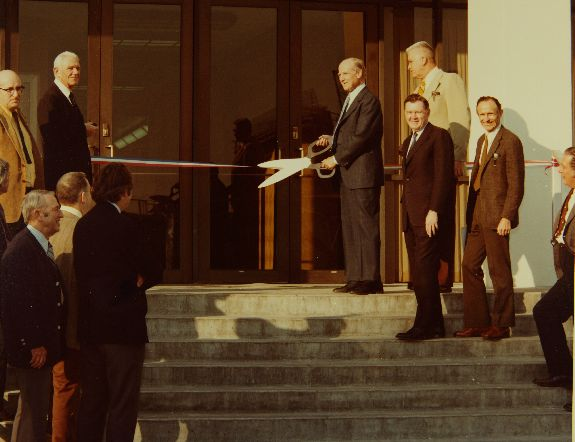
Pickering at JPL

Explorer III discovered the radiation field round the earth that is now known as the Van Allen radiation belt. Explorer 1 orbited for 10 years and was the forerunner of a number of successful JPL Earth and deep-space satellites. William Hayward Pickering is not to be confused with William Henry Pickering, an astronomer from an earlier era.

At the time of his retirement as director, in 1976, the Voyager missions were about to launch on tours of the outer planets and Viking 1 was on its way to land on Mars.

== Retirement ==
Pickering, keen to support authentic science in his home country, was Patron of New Zealand's only school-based research group, the Nexus Research Group, from 1999 until his death in 2004. Between 1977 and his death in 2004, Pickering also served as Patron of the New Zealand Spaceflight Association; a non-profit organisation that existed from 1977 to 2012 to promote an informed approach to astronautics and related sciences.

== Gifford Observatory ==
Pickering re-opened the Gifford Observatory as the guest of honour, on 25 March 2002. He had been a frequent user of the observatory during his school days in Wellington College.

== Death ==
Pickering died on 15 March 2004 of pneumonia at his home in La Cañada Flintridge, California, US.

== Honours ==
- In 1964, he was awarded the Golden Plate Award of the American Academy of Achievement.
- In 1964 he presented the Bernard Price Memorial Lecture in South Africa.
- 1965 The Institution of Professional Engineers New Zealand (IPENZ) Honorary Fellowship
- Magellanic Premium in 1966.
- IEEE Edison Medal in 1972, For contributions to telecommunications, rocket guidance and spacecraft control, and for inspiring leadership in unmanned exploration of the Solar System.
- National Medal of Science in 1975 awarded by President Gerald Ford
- Honorary (because of his American citizenship) investiture as a Knight Commander of the Order of the British Empire in 1975
- In 1980 he was inducted into the International Space Hall of Fame.
- In 1979, Pickering was inducted into the International Air & Space Hall of Fame at the San Diego Air & Space Museum.
- Japan Prize in 1994
- In the 2003 Queen's Birthday Honours, he was appointed an honorary member of the Order of New Zealand, the highest civilian award in the New Zealand honours system.
- Pickering is one of the few non-politicians to have appeared on the cover of Time magazine twice.

== Honorific eponyms ==
In 2009 to mark the International Year of Astronomy, William Hayward Pickering was selected along with cosmologist Beatrice Tinsley to have their names bestowed on peaks in the Kepler Mountains of New Zealand's Fiordland National Park. In December 2010 the New Zealand Geographic Board officially gazetted Mount Pickering as an official New Zealand place name.

Three roads in New Zealand have been named after Pickering, namely: Sir William Pickering Drive in the Canterbury Technology Park in Christchurch; Pickering Crescent in Hamilton; and William Pickering Drive in Auckland.

In December 2018 New Zealand company Rocket Lab announced that the fourth launch of their Electron rocket and their first mission for NASA's Educational Launch of Nanosatellites programme will be named "This one's for Pickering", in honour of Bill Pickering.

Minor planet 5738 Billpickering is named in his honour.

== Gallery ==
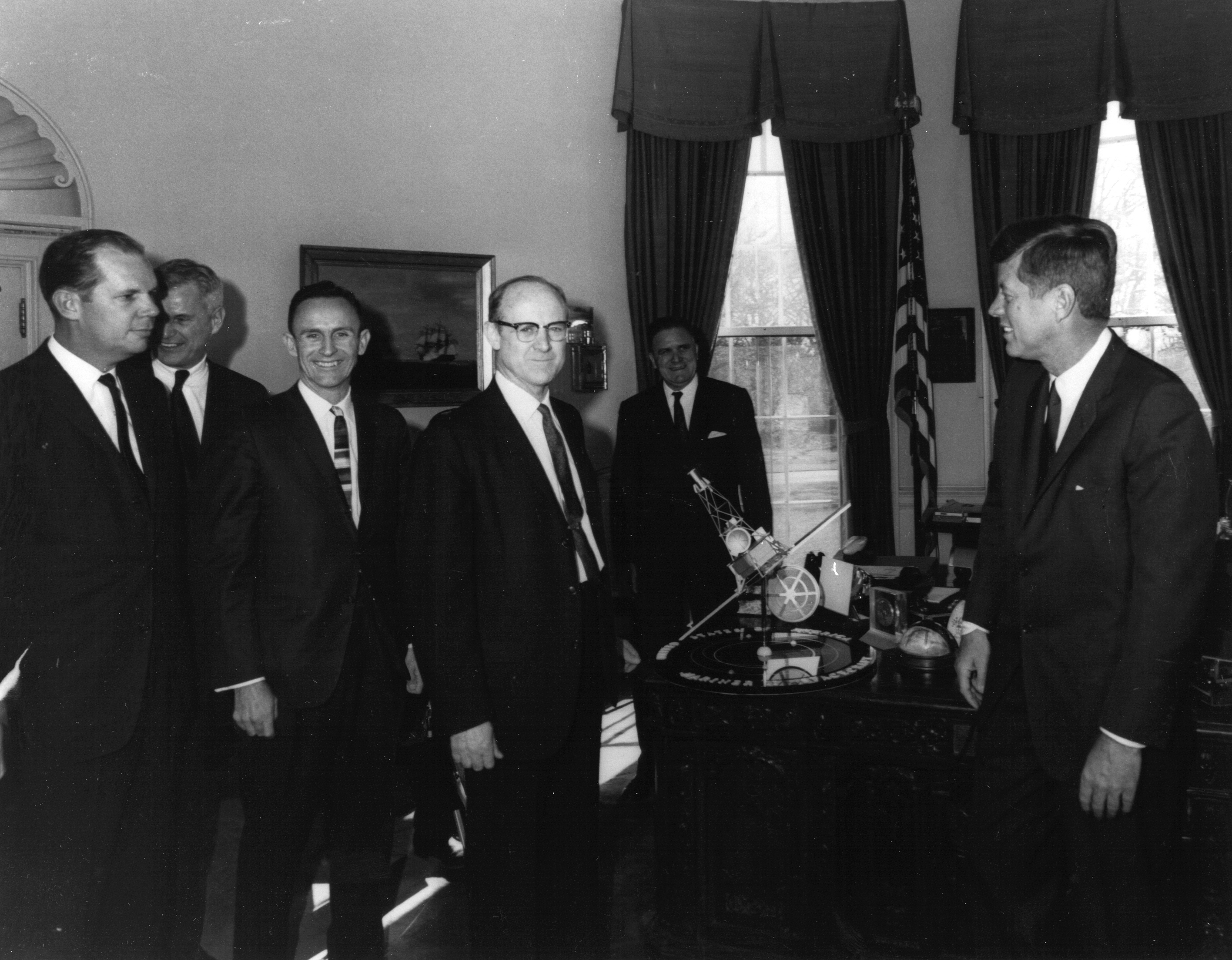
Pickering and Kennedy with a model of the Mariner 2 spacecraft

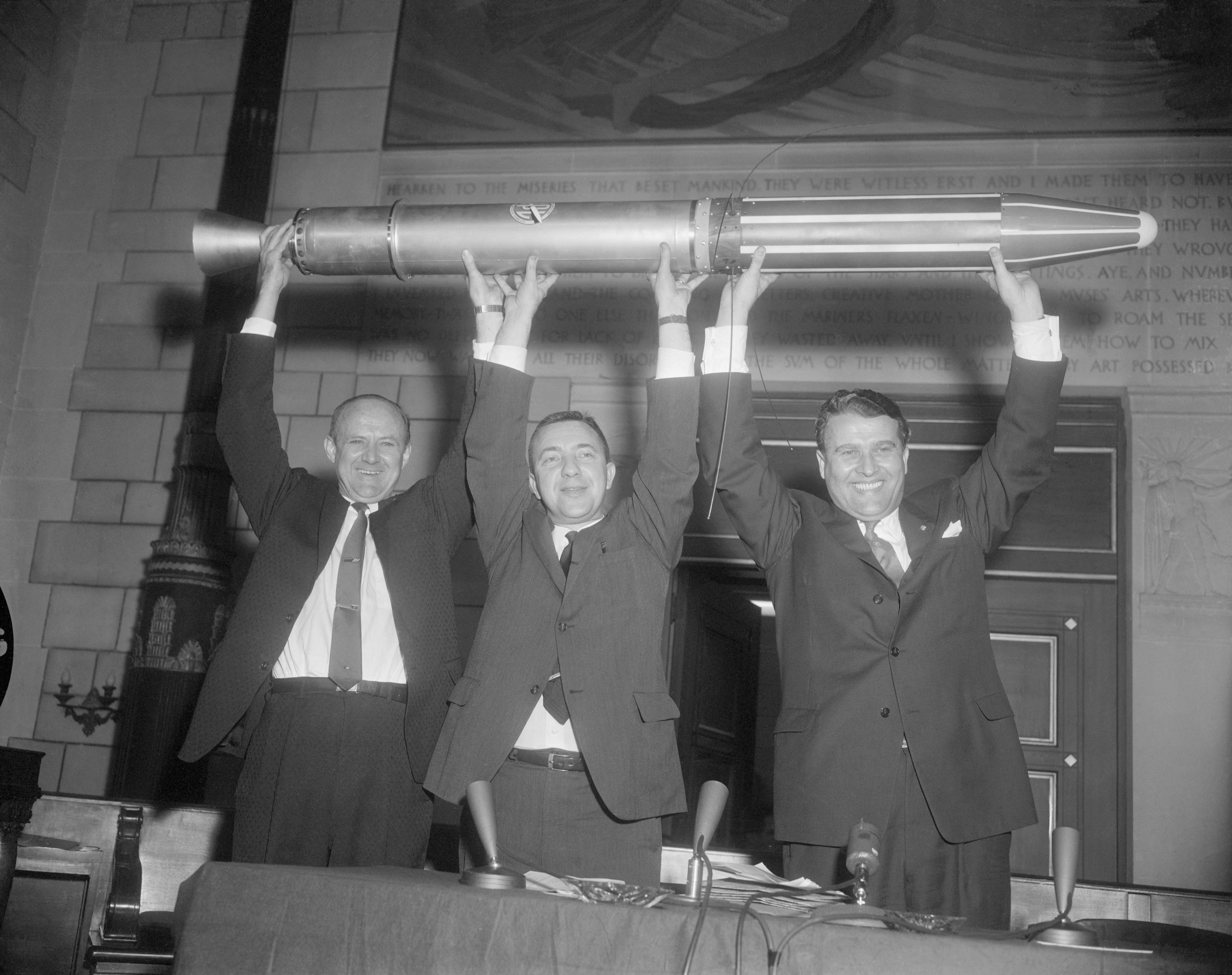
Pickering, Van Allen & Von Braun at NASA news conference.

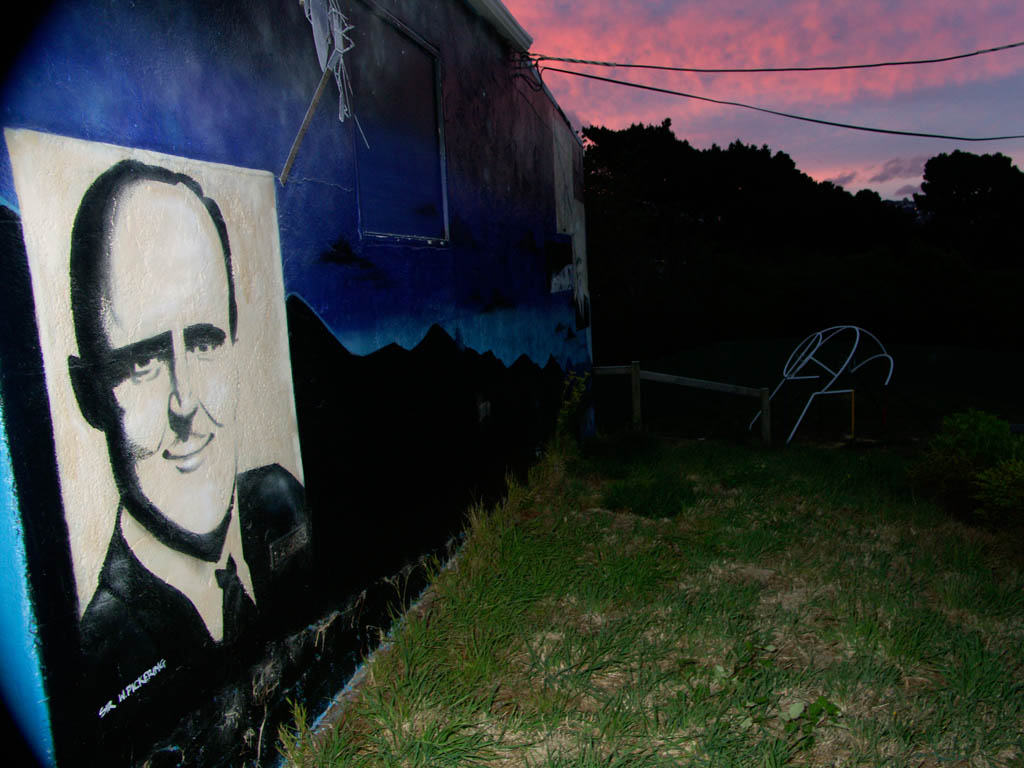
Observatory Mural showing Sir William Pickering.

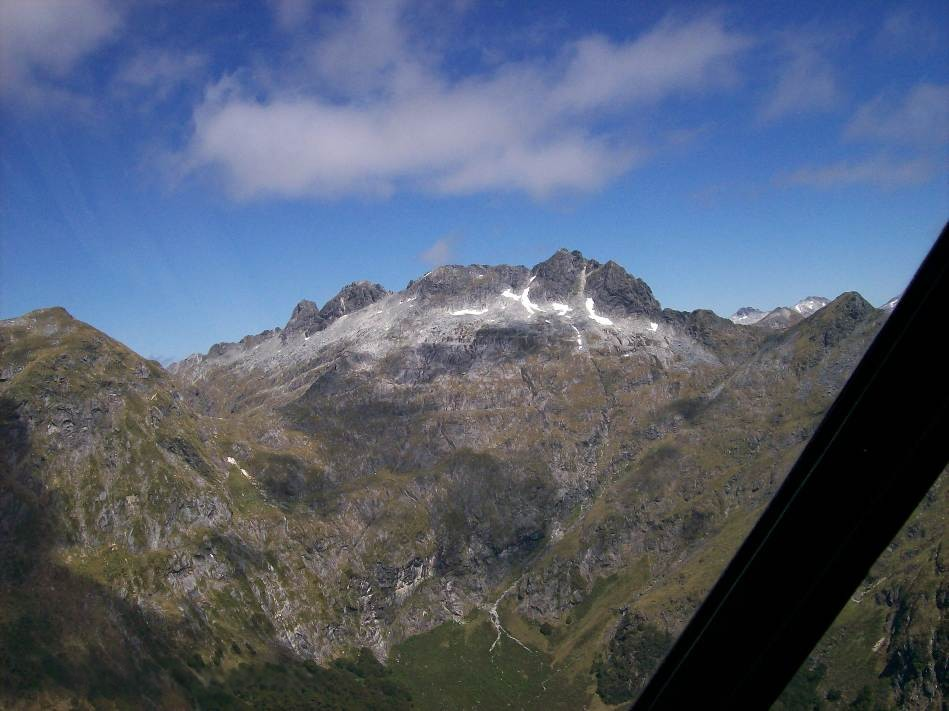
Mount Pickering Summit, Kepler Mountains Fiordland National Park New Zealand.

Academic offices
Preceded by Louis Dunn	4th Director of the Jet Propulsion Laboratory; 1954–1976	Succeeded by Bruce C. Murray
