= Louis Dunn =

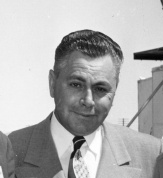

3rd Director of the Jet Propulsion Laboratory
- In office 1947–1954
- Preceded by: Frank Malina
- Succeeded by: William Hayward Pickering

Personal details
- Born: 1908 South Africa
- Died: 1979 (aged 70–71) San Andreas, California, US
- Scientific career
- Education: California Institute of Technology (BS, MS, MS, PhD)
- Fields: aeronautical engineering
- Thesis: An Investigation of Sheet-Stiffener Panels Subjected to Compression Loads with Particular Reference to Torsionally Weak Stiffeners (1940)
- Doctoral advisors: Ernest Edwin Sechler; Theodore von Kármán

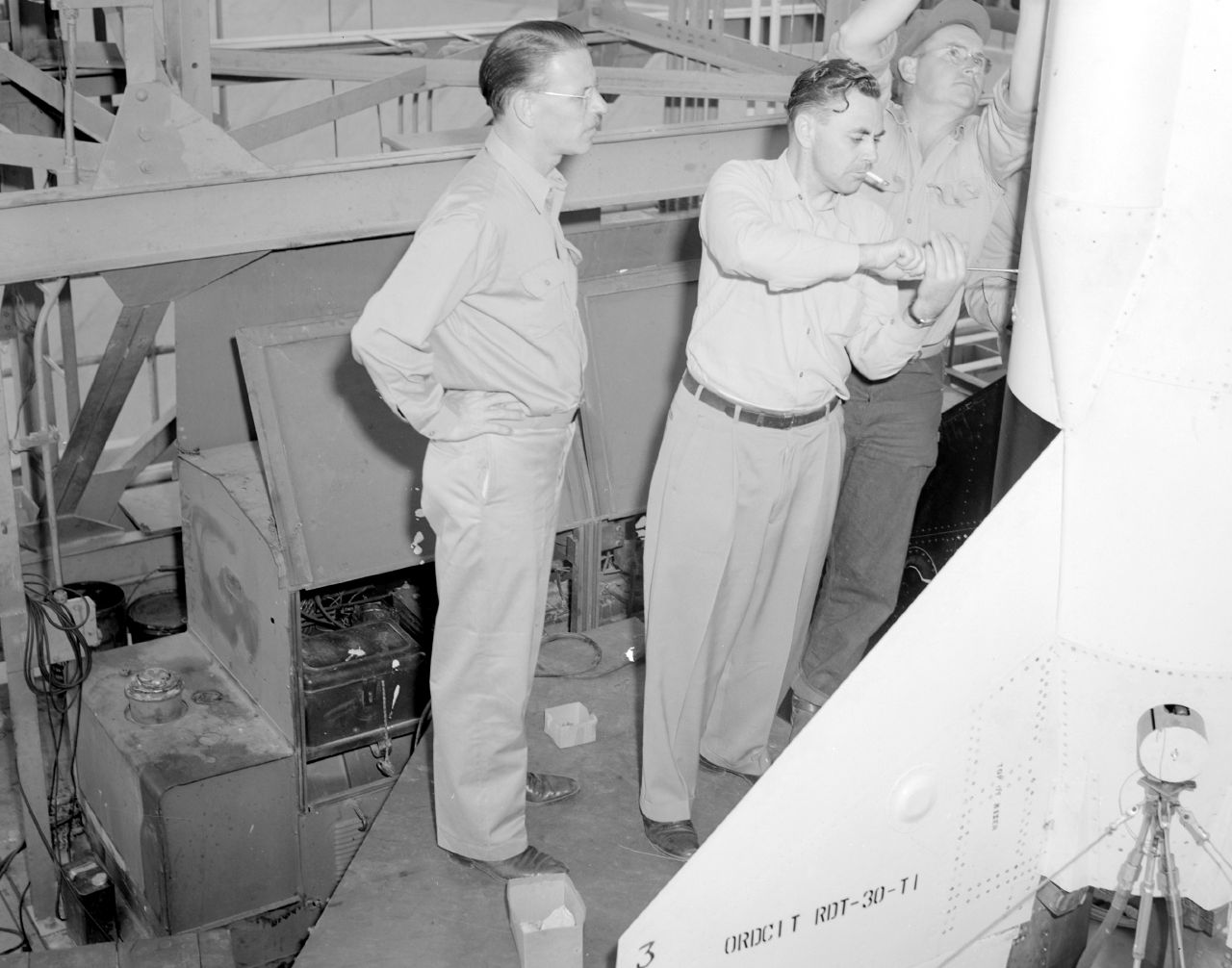
Dr. Dunn is shown doing last minute adjustments on a Corporal missile at the White Sands Missile Range in New Mexico, shortly before it is launched.

Louis Gerhardus Dunn (1908-1979) was a South African-born engineer who played a key role in the development of early American missiles and launch vehicles.

== Caltech ==
Dunn was born in South Africa in 1908 and later migrated to the United States in 1930. He attended the California Institute of Technology (Caltech) in Pasadena, California, where he eventually earned four degrees in engineering by 1940.

He initially trained as a mechanical engineer and earned a bachelor and his first master of science in that field. In 1937, he changed his major to aeronautical engineering and earned his second master and his doctorate in his new field of study. His research advisor for his second masters was Ernest Sechler while his doctoral advisors were Sechler and Theodore von Kármán.

During that time the Guggenheim Aeronautical Laboratory at Caltech (GALCIT), a prestigious aeronautical engineering research facility, was led by Theodore von Kármán. By 1943 Dunn had joined the Caltech faculty and become a naturalized U.S. citizen.

== JPL ==
In 1943 and 1944, von Kármán and Frank Malina, who had been doing rocket research at GALCIT, began using Jet Propulsion Laboratory (JPL) in the names of their projects. Malina hired Dunn to be the assistant director of JPL in 1945. Dunn took over as acting director when Malina left and was formally appointed as director in 1947. Dunn resigned from this position in 1954. William Hayward Pickering, who had been project manager for the Corporal missile under Dunn, succeeded him as JPL director.

== Ramo-Woolridge and Aerojet General ==
After leaving JPL Dunn led the Atlas missile program at the Ramo-Wooldridge Corporation, a predecessor of TRW. In 1963 he moved to Aerojet General, and he died at his home in Mountain Ranch, CA on August 13, 1979.

After suffering a mild heart attack in 1958, Dunn semi-retired and moved to cattle ranch in Mountain Ranch in Calavaras County in 1962. He died in San Andreas, California, in August 1979.

Academic offices
Preceded by Frank Malina	3rd Director of the Jet Propulsion Laboratory; 1947 – 1954	Succeeded by William Hayward Pickering
