= Proceedings of the Combustion Institute =

- Discipline: Combustion phenomena
- Language: English
- Edited by: Deanna Lacoste; Michael Mueller; Fei Qi

Publication details
- Former name(s): Symposium (International) on Combustion; Symposium on Combustion and Flame, and Explosion Phenomena; Proceedings of the Symposium on Combustion
- History: 1948-today
- Publisher: Elsevier
- Frequency: Biennial
- Open access: Option
- Impact factor: 5.3 (2023)

Standard abbreviations
- ISO 4: Proc. Combust. Inst.

Indexing
- ISSN: 1540-7489

Links
- Journal homepage; Online access

The Proceedings of the Combustion Institute are the proceedings of the biennial Combustion Symposium put on by The Combustion Institute. The publication contains the most significant contributions in fundamentals and applications, fundamental research of combustion science and combustion phenomena. Research papers and invited topical reviews are included on topics of reaction kinetics, soot, PAH and other large molecules, diagnostics, laminar flames, turbulent flames, heterogenous combustion, spray and droplet combustion, detonations, explosions and supersonic combustion, fire research, stationary combustion systems, internal combustion engine and gas turbine combustion, and new technology concepts. The editors-in-chief are Deanna Lacoste (KAUST), Michael Mueller (Princeton University) and Fei Qi (Shanghai Jiao Tong University).

== History ==
The need for development of automotive engines, fuels, and aviation formed the basis for the organization which became The Combustion Institute. The first three symposiums were held in 1928, 1937, and 1948. Since 1952, symposiums have been held every second year. The first combustion symposium with published proceedings was in 1948.

== Abstracting and indexing ==
The journal is abstracted and indexed in:

- Cambridge Scientific Abstracts
- Current Contents
- EI/Compendex Plus
- EMBASE
- FLUIDEX
- Fuel and Energy Abstracts
- Inspec
- PASCAL
- Scopus

According to the Journal Citation Reports, the journal has a 2015 impact factor of 4.120.

== See also ==
- Combustion Science and Technology
- Combustion and Flame
- Combustion Theory and Modelling
- Progress in Energy and Combustion Science
- Application in Energy and Combustion Science
