= Trinity Academy Grammar =

Coordinates: 53.7140°N 1.9088°W

Location
- Albert Road; Sowerby Bridge, West Yorkshire, HX6 2NW; England

Information
- Type: Academy
- Local authority: Calderdale
- Trust: Trinity Multi Academy Trust
- Department for Education URN: 144946 Tables
- Ofsted: Reports
- Principal: Elizabeth Fairhurst
- Gender: Coeducational
- Age: 11 to 16
- Enrolment: 982
- Capacity: 1050
- Website: grammar.trinitymat.org

Trinity Academy Grammar, formerly known as Trinity Academy Sowerby Bridge, is a coeducational secondary school in Sowerby Bridge, Calderdale, West Yorkshire, England. The school specialises in maths and computing.

== History ==
Originally the school which became Sowerby Bridge High School, then later Trinity Academy Grammar, existed in conjunction with the Sowerby Bridge Technical Institute in the Town Hall Chambers on Wharf Street in Sowerby Bridge. In 1905 the new school on Albert Road was opened at Sowerby Bridge Secondary School. This later became Sowerby Bridge Grammar School.

In 1980 the school reverted from its Grammar School status to a High School. Sowerby Bridge High School was assessed by Ofsted throughout the 2000s and 2010s which showed a downfall in standards at the School until, on 18 October 2016, the School was deemed inadequate and thereafter closed on 30 September 2018 in late 2018 the school was placed under Trinity Multi-Academy Trust and renamed Trinity Academy Sowerby Bridge. In 2021 the school was renamed Trinity Academy Grammar. As of July 2022 no further Ofsted report has been carried out.

== Alumni and notable staff ==
=== Sowerby Bridge Grammar School ===
- Roger Hargreaves - Author (Mr. Men)
- Sally Wainwright - TV drama writer
- Peter Brook - head of art, painter
