= Ernest Edwin Sechler =

American aerospace engineer (1905–1979)

Ernest Sechler
- Born: November 17, 1905; Pueblo, Colorado
- Died: August 14, 1979 (aged 73)
- Education: Caltech
- Scientific career
- Fields: Aerospace engineering
- Workplaces: Caltech
- Thesis: The Ultimate Compressive Strength of Thin Sheet Metal Panels (1934)
- Doctoral advisor: Theodore von Kármán
- Doctoral students: Louis Dunn; Y C Fung; Sitaram Rao Valluri

Ernest Edwin Sechler (1905-1979) was an aerospace engineer and scientist who specialized in thin-shell structures. He earned his doctorate in 1934 at Caltech as one of the early students of Theodore von Kármán with a dissertation on the mechanics of thin-plate compression.

Sechler contributed to the transition from wood to metal for construction of airframes.

A graduate student named Ernest E. Sechler (now a professor of aeronautics at Caltech) was reviewing research in the strength of thin metal plates which had been carried out by the National Bureau of Standards. Sechler reported that the engineers didn’t think that sheet metal could be used to make structural elements in an airplane because the metal would give way...Sechler’s report intrigued me.

Von Kármán showed that by stiffening with re-enforcing strips the "effective width" of metal sheets could be increased to withstand the load aloft. In 1934 Sechler wrote his thesis, The ultimate compressive strength of thin sheet metal panels, under von Karman's supervision.

"Development of light, fail-safe structure became the main theme of his professional life." His thin-wall structures included missiles, booster rockets, and a movable dome for Palomar Observatory. This work was performed as consultant to NASA and industry.

Sechler wrote two of the standard references on shell structures: In 1942 he and Louis Dunn wrote Airplane Structural Analysis and Design. A decade later he contributed Elasticity in Engineering. In review, William Fuller Brown Jr. said that "Some of the basic topics are discussed least clearly." Another reviewer noted that "many practical examples have been included to illustrate the various methods of structural analysis."

Sechler was responsible for the aeronautics graduate education at the Guggenheim Aeronautical Laboratory. He had "an unbelievable intuitive understanding of the potential of an incoming student."

Sechler was a Fellow of the American Institute of Aeronautics and Astronautics, a member of the American Association for the Advancement of Science, and of the California Academy of Sciences. He was elected to the National Academy of Engineering in 1979, the year of his death.
