= Combustion Science and Technology =

- Discipline: Combustion
- Language: English
- Edited by: Richard A. Yetter

Publication details
- Former name(s): Pyrodynamics
- History: 1964–present
- Publisher: Taylor & Francis
- Frequency: 16/year
- Impact factor: 1.7 (2023)

Standard abbreviations
- ISO 4: Combust. Sci. Technol.

Indexing
- CODEN: CBSTB9
- ISSN: 0010-2202 (print); 1563-521X (web)
- LCCN: 71009946
- OCLC no.: 969983292
- Pyrodynamics
- CODEN: PYDYAE
- ISSN: 0555-8344
- LCCN: 64009424
- OCLC no.: 1606040

Links
- Journal homepage; Online access; Online archive

Combustion Science and Technology is a monthly peer-reviewed scientific journal covering research on combustion. The editor-in-chief is Richard A. Yetter (Pennsylvania State University). It is published by Taylor & Francis and was established in 1964 as Pyrodynamics, obtaining its current name in 1969.

== Abstracting and indexing ==
The journal is abstracted and indexed in,

- Chemical Abstracts Service
- CSA databases
- Current Contents/Engineering, Computing, & Technology
- EBSCO databases
- EI Compendex
- Science Citation Index
- Scopus

According to the Journal Citation Reports, the journal has a 2023 impact factor of 1.7.

== See also ==
- Combustion Theory and Modelling
- Combustion and Flame
- Proceedings of the Combustion Institute
- Progress in Energy and Combustion Science
- AIAA Journal
- Journal of Propulsion and Power
