= Institut de Mécanique des Fluides de Toulouse =

French research laboratory

- IMFT
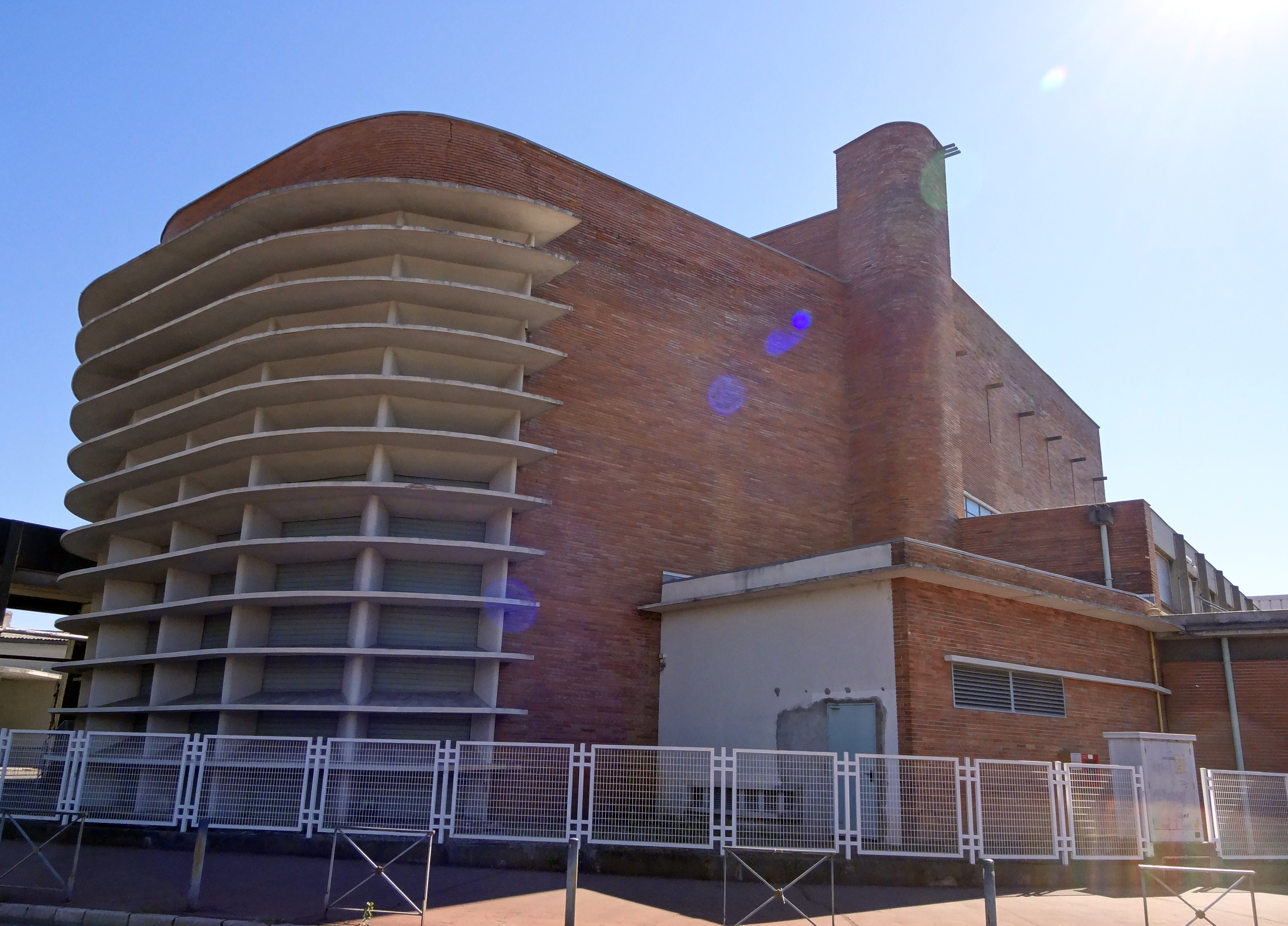
- Laboratory view
- Established: 1913
- Field of research: Fluid Mechanics; Turbulence modelling
- Director: Eric Climent
- Staff: +200
- Location: Toulouse, Haute-Garonne, France; 43°35′17″N 1°26′14″W
- Affiliations: CNRS; University of Toulouse; ENSEEIHT; Institut National Polytechnique de Toulouse (INPT); Université Toulouse III - Paul Sabatier
- Website: http://www.imft.fr, https://www.imft.fr/en/accueil-english/
- Institut de Mécanique des Fluides de Toulouse
- Location within France
- Location: 2 Allée du Pr Camille Soula, Toulouse
- Coordinates: 43°35′17″N 1°26′14″E
- Built: 1913

The Institut de Mécanique des Fluides de Toulouse (Institute of Fluid Mechanics of Toulouse, abbreviation IMFT) is a joint research laboratory involving the National Polytechnic Institute of Toulouse (INPT), the French National Centre for Scientific Research (CNRS) and the Paul Sabatier University. The laboratory develops research activities related to Fluid Mechanics and Fluid Dynamics.

It is based on an island in the centre of the Garonne river, in Toulouse.

== History ==
The Institut de Mécanique des Fluides de Toulouse (IMFT) was established in 1913 by Charles Camichel, in conjunction with the hydroelectric development of the Pyrenees and the growth of the aeronautical industry. Initial hydraulic research was conducted at the Institute of Electrotechnics and Applied Mechanics, located on the current site of ENSEEIHT. Camichel gained recognition for his pioneering studies on overpressure and "water hammer" effects in pressurized pipelines.

In 1920, the Hydraulic Research Laboratory was founded near the Banlève dam, on Ramier Island, between the two branches of the Garonne River. This marked the beginning of experimental studies using scaled models. By 1925, although the laboratory lacked a dedicated building, six researchers were working there, and the construction of the 4-meter-deep Grand Rectilinear Canal, connecting both branches of the river, was completed.

In 1930, as part of a national initiative to support the aeronautical industry, the Ministry of Air and the University of Toulouse formally established the Institute of Fluid Mechanics of Toulouse, building on the research foundation of the Electrotechnical Institute of Toulouse (IET). This transition cemented the IMFT's role in advancing aeronautical research. In 1936, the construction of the Large Wind Tunnel began, solidifying the institute's specialization in aerodynamics. Initially built outdoors, the wind tunnel was covered in 1938 and is now a classified National Historic Monument.

The 1950s saw significant expansion of hydraulic research, which led to the development of new academic programs, notably third-cycle courses preparing engineering students for careers in research. By the early 1970s, hydraulics remained the laboratory's primary focus, but during this period, research topics broadened to include turbulence modeling and the study of transport phenomena in porous media. The introduction of electronic instrumentation enabled the exploration of previously inaccessible phenomena, reinforcing the IMFT's experimental focus. Additionally, the arrival of the first computers at the institute fostered its specialization in numerical flow simulations. In 1965, the IMFT became the fifth laboratory to be officially associated with the CNRS (National Center for Scientific Research).

In the 1980s, new research areas emerged, including two-phase flow modeling and combustion. Throughout its history, the IMFT has been shaped by key scientific figures, notably its founder Professor Charles Camichel, a graduate of the École Polytechnique and elected to the Académie des Sciences in 1936, and Professor Léopold Escande, elected to the Académie des Sciences in 1954 and founder of the Institut National Polytechnique de Toulouse (INPT).

The IMFT's affiliation extends to the National Polytechnic Institute of Toulouse (INPT) through ENSEEIHT, Paul Sabatier University, and the CNRS. It specializes in hydraulics and fluid mechanics and has become one of Europe's leading research institutions in the field. The institute continued to diversify its research areas in the 2000s, particularly in ecology, renewable energy, and biomechanics, all while maintaining strong ties to its educational departments. By this time, the IMFT had grown to more than 200 staff members, continuing to push the boundaries of scientific inquiry in fluid mechanics.
