= FLUIDEX =

Online bibliographic database

FLUIDEX is an online bibliographic database that covers fluids behavior, applications, and engineering in civil engineering and process engineering. It is published by Elsevier.

Indexing includes more than 900,000 past and current records pertaining to relevant trade magazines and scientific journals from 1966–present. Further topical coverage includes research and technology in fluid dynamics, separation processes, offshore platform issues, and new hydraulic and pneumatic equipment applications and operations. Abstracts summarize 98% of all documents.

Global literature coverage includes over 400 trade and peer-reviewed publications. Additionally, archives contain several hundred cataloged trade, peer-reviewed, and book titles. The database is annually updated with more than 40,000 abstracts and citations. OVID and Dialog are online access points. This database is also published in a printed paper format. Hence, the print counterparts are "Fluid Abstracts: Process Engineering" (ISSN 0962-7162), and "Fluid Abstracts: Civil engineering" (ISSN 0962-7170).
