= The Combustion Institute =

- Formation: 1954
- Type: Non-profit educational society
- Purpose: Combustion science
- Headquarters: Pittsburgh, Pennsylvania, U.S.
- Location: United States
- Region served: World

The Combustion Institute is an educational non-profit, international, scientific and engineering society whose purpose is to promote research in combustion science. The institute was established in 1954, and its headquarters are in Pittsburgh, Pennsylvania, United States. The current president of The Combustion Institute is Hai Wang (2024 - Present).

== Foundation and Mission ==
The support of this important field of study spanning many scientific and engineering disciplines is done through the discussion of research findings at regional, national and the biennial international symposia, and through the publication of the Proceedings of the Combustion Institute and the Institute's journals, Combustion and Flame and the affiliated journals Progress in Energy and Combustion Science, Combustion Science and Technology and Combustion Theory and Modelling.

The Institute serves as the parent organization for thirty-six national sections organized in many geographical regions (the United States being divided into three sections) as of 2025:

- Adria
- Australia/New Zealand
- Belarus
- Belgium
- Brazil
- Canada
- Chile
- China
- Egypt
- France
- Germany
- Great Britain
- Greece
- Hungary
- India
- Iran
- Ireland
- Israel
- Italy
- Japan
- Mexico
- Netherlands
- Poland
- Portugal
- Republic of Korea
- Russian Federation
- Saudi Arabia
- Scandinavian - Nordic
- Singapore
- Spain
- Sweden
- Taiwan
- Turkey
- USA Central States
- USA Eastern States
- USA Western States

In honor of the fiftieth anniversary of The Combustion Institute, leading combustion scientists John D. Buckmaster, Paul Clavin, Amable Liñán, Moshe Matalon, Norbert Peters, Gregory Sivashinsky and Forman A. Williams wrote a paper in the Proceedings of the Combustion Institute.

== International Symposium on Combustion ==
The International Symposium on Combustion (ISOC) is organized by The Combustion Institute biennially. The first symposium on combustion was held in 1928 in the United States and the first international symposium on combustion was held on 1948, even though The Combustion Institute itself was founded in 1954. Forty symposia have been held so far, with the 41st ISOC to be held in Kyoto, Japan in July 2026.

== Institute Awards ==
During each ISOC, The Combustion Institute awards the following:

- Bernard Lewis Gold Medal – established in 1958 and awarded for brilliant research in the field of combustion.
- Alfred C. Egerton Gold Medal – established in 1958 and awarded biennially for distinguished, continuing and encouraging contributions to the field of combustion.
- Silver Combustion Medal – established in 1958 and awarded to an outstanding paper presented at the previous symposium.
- The Hottel Lecture.
- Ya B. Zeldovich Gold Medal – established in 1990 and awarded for outstanding contribution to the theory of combustion or detonation.
- Bernard Lewis Fellowship – established in 1996 during the 26th International Symposium, this award is awarded to encourage high quality research in combustion by young scientists and engineers.
- Distinguished Papers - The Combustion Institute – established in 1996 during the 31st International Symposium, this award is presented to the paper in each of the twelve colloquia of a Symposium which is judged to be most distinguished in quality, achievement and significance.
- Bernard Lewis Visiting Lecturer Fellowship.
- Hiroshi Tsuji Early Career Researcher Award.

== See also ==
- International Flame Research Foundation
