= Progress in Energy and Combustion Science =

- Discipline: Energy and combustion science
- Language: English
- Edited by: Hai Wang, Christof Schulz

Publication details
- History: 1975-present
- Publisher: Elsevier
- Frequency: Bimonthly
- Impact factor: 32.0 (2023)

Standard abbreviations
- ISO 4: Prog. Energy Combust. Sci.

Indexing
- CODEN: PECSDO
- ISSN: 0360-1285

Links
- Journal homepage; Online access

Progress in Energy and Combustion Science is a bimonthly peer-reviewed review journal published by Elsevier. Established in 1975, the journal publishes review articles on all aspects of energy and combustion science. All contributions are by invitation of the editors-in-chief. The founding editor is Norman Chigier (Carnegie Mellon University). The current editors-in-chief are Hai Wang (Stanford University) and Christof Schulz (University of Duisburg-Essen).

According to the Journal Citation Reports, the journal has a 2023 impact factor of 32.0.
