= Wolfgang Haack =

German mathematician (1902–1994)

Wolfgang Siegfried Haack
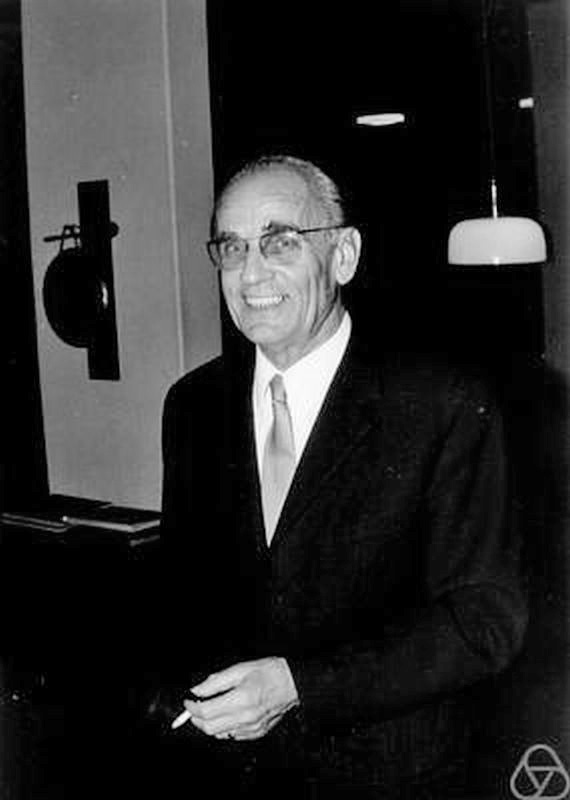
- Wolfgang Haack, around 1970 in Oberwolfach
- Born: 24 April 1902; Gotha
- Died: 28 November 1994 (aged 92); Berlin
- Citizenship: Germany
- Education: Leibniz University Hannover (MSc), University of Jena (PhD)
- Occupations: scientist, researcher, professor of mathematics and mechanics, professor of numerical mathematics
- Known for: mechanical engineering, mathematics, aerodynamics

Wolfgang Siegfried Haack (24 April 1902 – 28 November 1994) was a German mathematician and aerodynamicist. He in 1941 and William Sears in 1947 independently discovered the Sears–Haack body.

== Life ==
Wolfgang Haack studied mechanical engineering at the Leibniz University Hannover and mathematics in Jena. He earned his doctorate in 1926 at the Friedrich Schiller University in Jena. After a short study and research period in Hamburg and a job as an assistant at the Technical University of Stuttgart he habilitated in 1929 at the TH Danzig (now Gdańsk). In 1935 he moved to the TH Berlin and in 1937, he followed the call to the TH Karlsruhe. During the Second World War he worked on projectile design. Although the TH Berlin did invite him to work there in 1944, Wolfgang Haack was unable to take up the post because of the war. In 1949 he became the successor to Georg Hamel as Professor of Mathematics and Mechanics at the TU Berlin Department of Mathematics and Mechanics. On his initiative a new Department of Computational Mathematics was founded in 1964, which he held until his retirement in 1968. In 1992 Haack was appointed as an honorary member of the Society for Applied Mathematics and Mechanics. In 1964 Haack was called to the new chair for numerical mathematics, a position he was to hold until being given emeritus status in 1968.

== Applied mathematics ==
The interaction of Wolfgang Haack is at the interface between mathematics and mechanics. His research areas ranged from the mechanics of differential geometry and partial differential equations to numerical mathematics. In particular, he dealt with both elliptical and with hyperbolic partial differential equations of the first order. Coming from differential geometry, Pfaff's differential forms were always of special concern to him. As an engineer, he was always focussed on applied research, such as gas dynamics in supersonic flows. During his time in Berlin, he supervised over a dozen dissertations.

== Haack minimum drag shapes ==
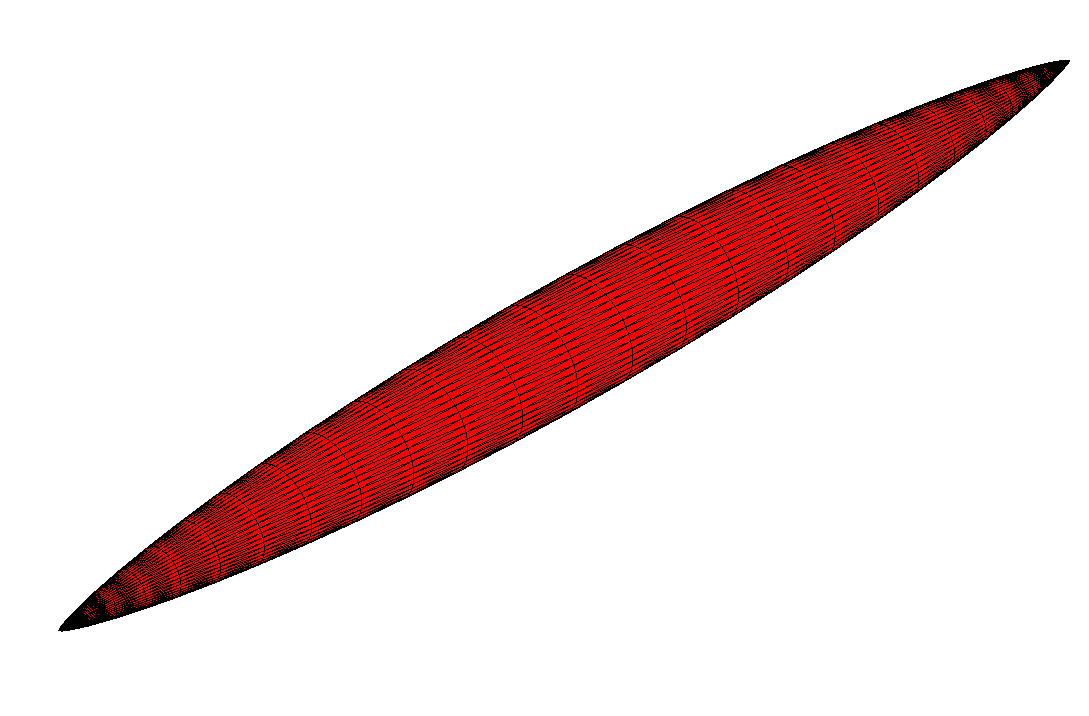
Sears-Haack body

During World War II, Haack was involved in Nazi military research. His work on an analytical formula for projectile nose cone shapes that exhibit the lowest air resistance depending on caliber or diameter and length or volume and length of the profile was published in 1941 by the Lilienthal society but was kept secret during World War II.

Haack shapes or Sears–Haack bodies are not ogives or constructed from any other geometric figures. The shapes are instead mathematically derived streamlined bodies of revolution for the purpose of minimizing drag. Minimal projectile-shape variations can change the air-resistance and hence the effective range of high powered gun projectiles considerably, especially when they change velocity from the supersonic to the transonic and eventually to subsonic air flow regimes or vice versa during flight. For this kind of applications the Haack shape offers significantly improved characteristics compared to the tangent ogive or even the secant ogive often used for very-low-drag bullets and artillery shells. Only after the end of World War II have Haack shaped projectiles for artillery guns and sniper rifles been produced.

== Pioneer of numerical mathematics ==
Haack recognized early on the potential of computers for scientific and industrial research. As early as 1950 he established a working group on electronic calculating machines. He contacted Konrad Zuse with the aim that an electronic calculator would be acquired for the Technische Universität Berlin. The Deutsche Forschungsgemeinschaft assumed that the existing computing machines at Darmstadt, Göttingen and Munich were sufficient for the time being. It was due to his solicitation of donations from the private industry that in 1958 the first computer at the TU Berlin was set up.
