= Von Kármán (Martian crater) =

Martian impact crater

Von Kármán Crater
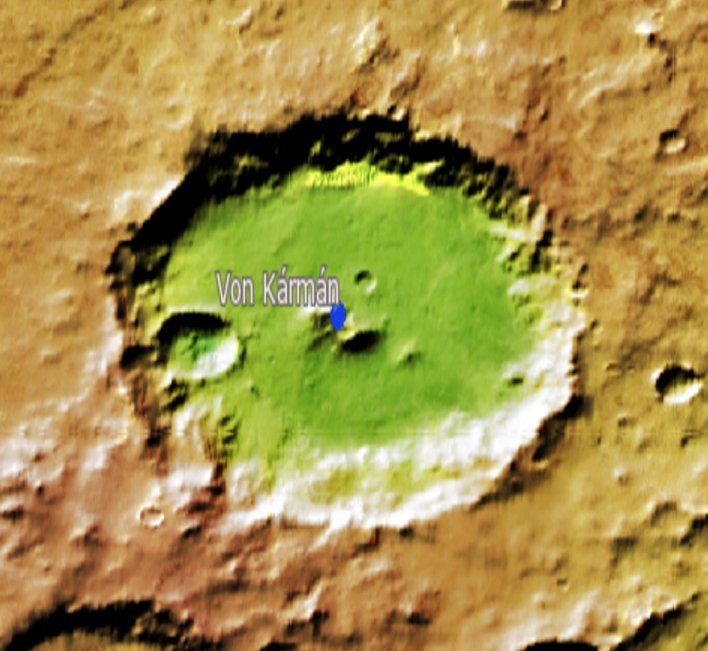
- Topographic map of Von Karman Crater
- Planet: Mars
- Region: Argyre quadrangle
- Coordinates: 64.6°S 58.5°W
- Quadrangle: Argyre
- Diameter: 90 km (56 mi)
- Eponym: Theodore von Kármán

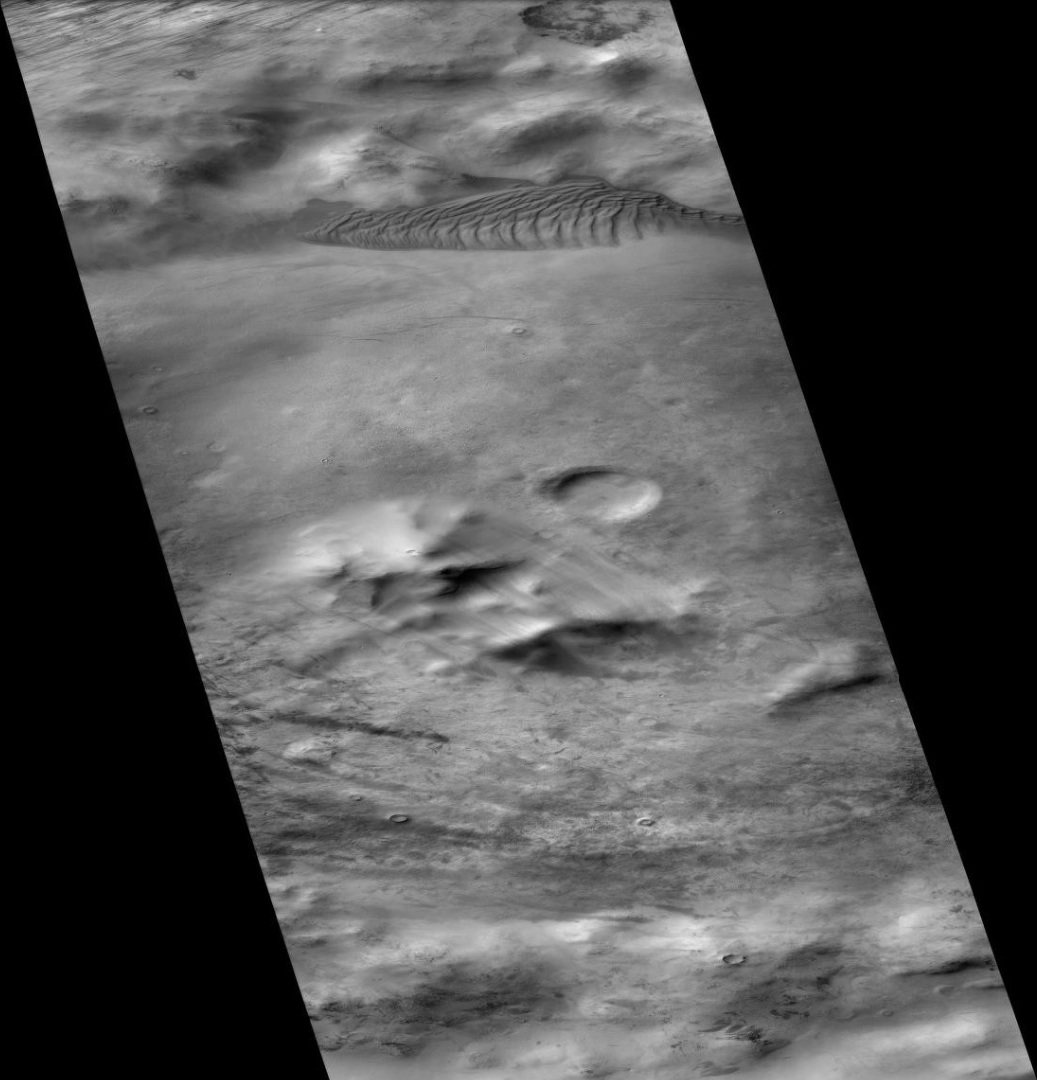
Von Kármán Crater, as seen by CTX camera (on Mars Reconnaissance Orbiter). Dark parts near the top are dunes.

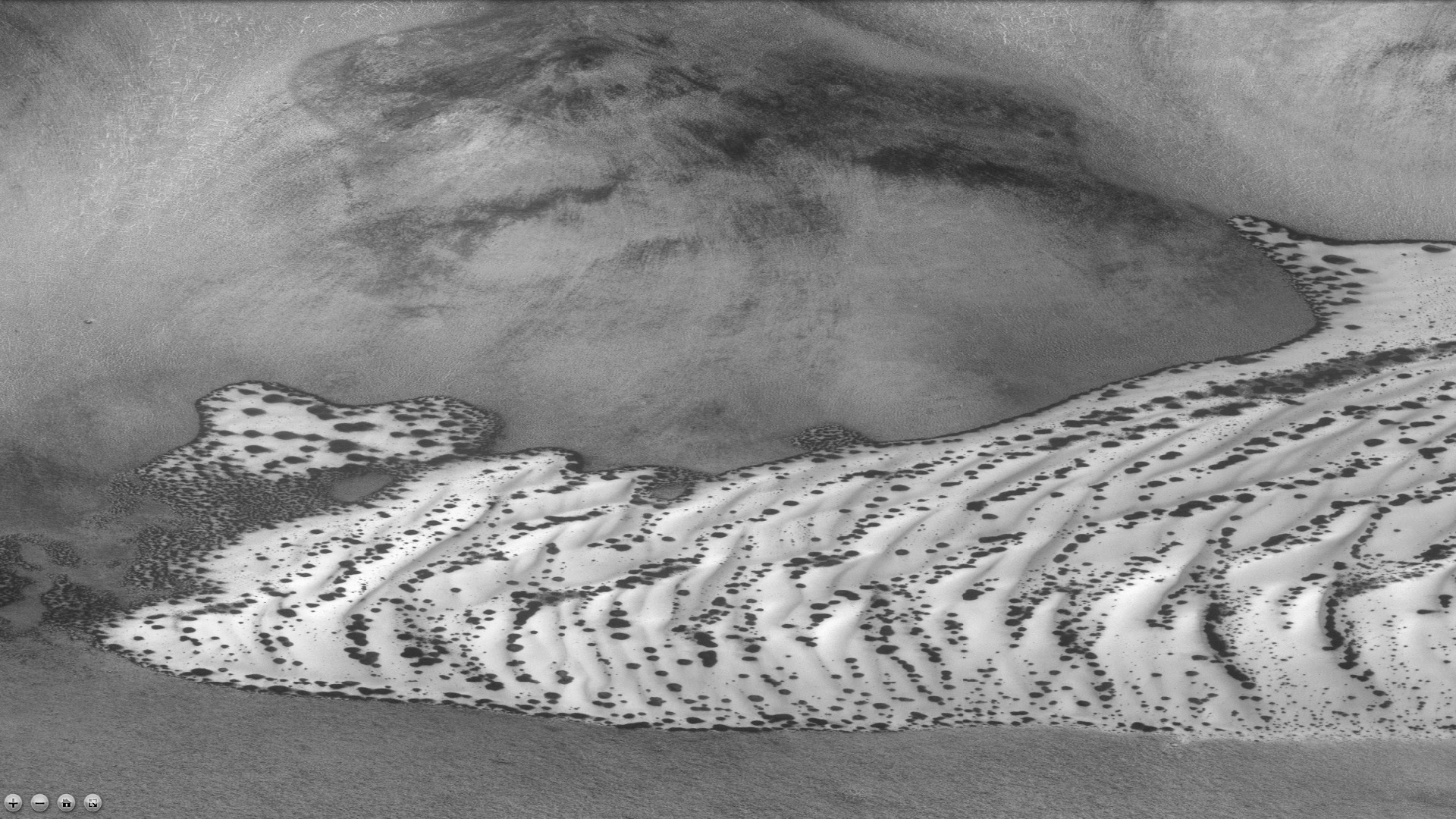
Defrosting dunes in Von Kármán Crater, as seen by CTX camera (on Mars Reconnaissance Orbiter). Dark places are where frost has left dark dunes. Picture taken in the springtime on Mars.

Von Kármán is an impact crater in the Argyre quadrangle of Mars, located at 64.6°S latitude and 58.5°W longitude. It is 90 km (56 mi) in diameter. It was named after Hungarian-American aeronautical engineer Theodore von Kármán.

The crater contains a large field of dunes. Usually, the dunes are very dark because they contain the dark volcanic rock basalt. However, in the winter they are become covered with frost. The pictures below show the frost disappearing. Dark spots appear on dunes in the higher latitudes of Mars. Sometimes geysers form near the spots.

The dunes have two main features, dark dune spots and spider channels, that appear at the beginning of the Martian spring on fields covered with carbon dioxide (CO_{2} or 'dry ice'), mainly at the ridges and slopes of the dunes. By the beginning of winter, they disappear. The dark spots are generally round; on the slopes they are usually elongated.

In these spots mineral grains may be covered with a thin film of water that may affect chemical weathering of minerals and may help possible Martian organisms to survive. Studies have shown that thin films of water could exist on the Martian surface at certain times and in certain locations. In some areas, thin layers of liquid water could be present for 38 sols (Martian days) during warmer periods of the day. With the stronger sunshine of spring in certain regions, carbon dioxide gas jets shoot dark dust in the air. This dust increases the absorption of light and causes the temperature to rise to where water can exist for short periods.

== See also ==
- List of craters on Mars
