= Taylor–Maccoll flow =

Flow behind a conical shock wave

Taylor–Maccoll flow refers to the steady flow behind a conical shock wave that is attached to a solid cone. The flow is named after G. I. Taylor and J. W. Maccoll, whom described the flow in 1933, guided by an earlier work of Theodore von Kármán.

== Mathematical description ==
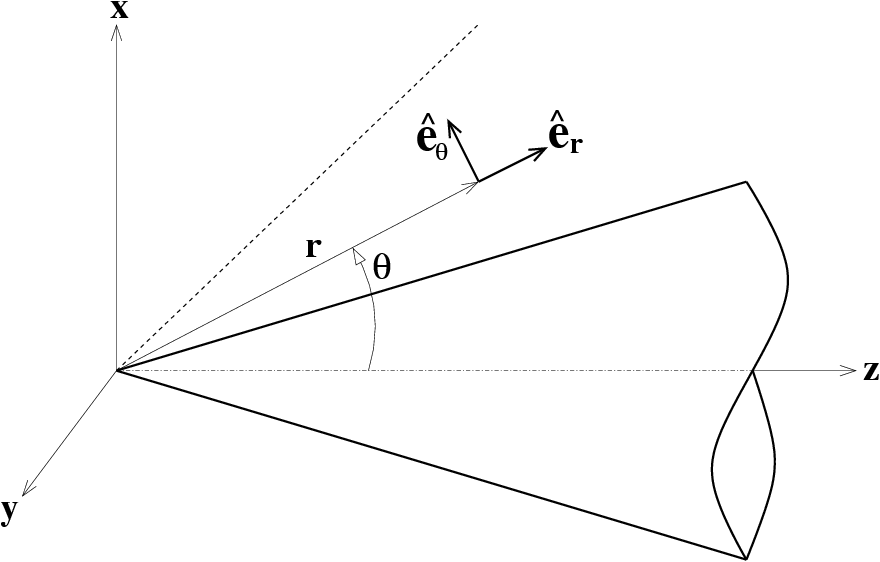
Coordinate system, where the dotted line depicts conical shock

Consider a steady supersonic flow past a solid cone that has a semi-vertical angle $\chi$. A conical shock wave can form in this situation, with the vertex of the shock wave lying at the vertex of the solid cone. If it were a two-dimensional problem, i.e., for a supersonic flow past a wedge, then the incoming stream would have deflected through an angle $\chi$ upon crossing the shock wave so that streamlines behind the shock wave would be parallel to the wedge sides. Such a simple turnover of streamlines is not possible for three-dimensional case. After passing through the shock wave, the streamlines are curved and only asymptotically they approach the generators of the cone. The curving of streamlines is accompanied by a gradual increase in density and decrease in velocity, in addition to those increments/decrements effected at the shock wave.

The direction and magnitude of the velocity immediately behind the oblique shock wave is given by weak branch of the shock polar. This particularly suggests that for each value of incoming Mach number $M_1$, there exists a maximum value of $\chi_{\mathrm{max}}$ beyond which shock polar do not provide solution under in which case the conical shock wave will have detached from the solid surface (see Mach reflection). These detached cases are not considered here. The flow immediately behind the oblique conical shock wave is typically supersonic, although however when $\chi$ is close to $\chi_{\mathrm{max}}$, it can be subsonic. The supersonic flow behind the shock wave will become subsonic as it evolves downstream.

Since all incident streamlines intersect the conical shock wave at the same angle, the intensity of the shock wave is constant. This particularly means that entropy jump across the shock wave is also constant throughout. In this case, the flow behind the shock wave is a potential flow. Hence we can introduce the velocity potential $\varphi$ such that $\mathbf v = \nabla\varphi$. Since the problem do not have any length scale and is clearly axisymmetric, the velocity field $\mathbf v$ and the pressure field $p$ will be turn out to functions of the polar angle $\theta$ only (the origin of the spherical coordinates $(r,\theta,\phi)$ is taken to be located at the vertex). This means that we have

$$\varphi=rf(\theta), \quad v_r = f(\theta), \quad v_\theta=f'(\theta), \quad v_\phi=0, \quad p = g(\theta).$$

The steady potential flow is governed by the equation

$$c^2\nabla\cdot\mathbf v - \mathbf v\cdot (\mathbf v \cdot \nabla)\mathbf v=0,$$

where the sound speed $c=c(v)$ is expressed as a function of the velocity magnitude $v^2=(\nabla\phi)^2$ only. Substituting the above assumed form for the velocity field, into the governing equation, we obtain the general Taylor–Maccoll equation

$$(c^2-f'^2) f'' + c^2 \cot\theta f' + (2c^2-f'^2) f = 0, \quad c = c(f^2+f'^2).$$

The equation is simplified greatly for a polytropic gas for which $c^2 = (\gamma-1)(h_0-v^2/2)$, i.e.,

$$c^2 = (\gamma-1)h_0 \left(1-\frac{f^2+f'^2}{2h_0}\right),$$

where $\gamma$ is the specific heat ratio and $h_0$ is the stagnation enthalpy. Introducing this formula into the general Taylor–Maccoll equation and introducing a non-dimensional function $F(\theta) = f(\theta)/v_{\mathrm{max}}$, where $v_{\mathrm{max}}= \sqrt{2h_0}$ (the speed of the potential flow when it flows out into a vacuum), we obtain, for the polytropic gas, the Taylor–Maccoll equation,

$$\left[\frac{\gamma+1}{2}F'^2-\frac{\gamma-1}{2}(1-F^2)\right]F'' = (\gamma-1) (1-F^2) F + \frac{\gamma-1}{2}\cot\theta(1-F^2)F' - \gamma F F'^2 - \frac{\gamma-1}{2}\cot\theta F'^3.$$

The equation must satisfy the condition that $F'(\chi)=0$ (no penetration on the solid surface) and also must correspond to conditions behind the shock wave at $\chi=\psi$, where $\psi$ is the half-angle of shock cone, which must be determined as part of the solution for a given incoming flow Mach number $M$ and $\gamma$. The Taylor–Maccoll equation has no known explicit solution and it is integrated numerically.

== Kármán–Moore solution ==
When the cone angle is very small, the flow is nearly parallel everywhere in which case, an exact solution can be found, as shown by Theodore von Kármán and Norton B. Moore in 1932. The solution is more apparent in the cylindrical coordinates $(\rho,\varpi,z)$ (the $\rho$ here is the radial distance from the $z$-axis, and not the density). If $U$ is the speed of the incoming flow, then we write $\varphi = Uz + \phi$, where $\phi$ is a small correction and satisfies

$$\frac{1}{\rho}\frac{\partial }{\partial \rho}\left(\rho\frac{\partial \phi}{\partial \rho}\right) -\beta^2 \frac{\partial^2 \phi}{\partial z^2}=0, \quad \beta^2 = M^2-1$$

where $M=U/c_\infty$ is the Mach number of the incoming flow. We expect the velocity components to depend only on $\theta$, i.e., $\rho/z=\tan\theta$ in cylindrical coordinates, which means that we must have $\phi = zg(\xi)$, where $\xi = \rho/z$ is a self-similar coordinate. The governing equation reduces to

$$\xi(1-\beta^2\xi^2) g'' + g'=0.$$

On the surface of the cone $\xi = \tan\chi \approx \chi$, we must have $v_\rho/v_z=(\partial\phi/\partial \rho)/(U+\partial\phi/\partial z)\approx (1/U)\partial\phi/\partial \rho=\chi$ and consequently $g'=U\chi$.

In the small-angle approximation, the weak shock cone is given by $z=\beta \rho$. The trivial solution for $g$ describes the uniform flow upstream of the shock cone, whereas the non-trivial solution satisfying the boundary condition on the solid surface behind the shock wave is given by

$$g(\xi) = U \chi^2 \left(\sqrt{1-\beta^2\xi^2}-\cosh^{-1}\frac{1}{\beta\xi}\right).$$

We therefore have

$$\varphi = Uz +U \chi^2 \left(\sqrt{z^2-\beta^2\rho^2}-z\cosh^{-1}\frac{z}{\beta \rho}\right)$$

exhibiting a logarithmic singularity as $\rho\to 0.$ The velocity components are given by

$$v_z = U - U\chi^2 \cosh^{-1}\frac{z}{\beta \rho}, \quad v_\rho = \frac{U\chi^2}{\rho} \sqrt{z^2-\beta^2 \rho^2}.$$

The pressure on the surface of the cone $p_s$ is found to be $p_s -p_\infty = \rho_\infty U^2\chi^2[\ln (2/\beta\chi)-1/2]$ (in this formula, $\rho_\infty$ is the density of the incoming gas).

== See also ==
- Kármán–Moore theory
