= Sears–Haack body =

Most aerodynamic shape for supersonic vehicles

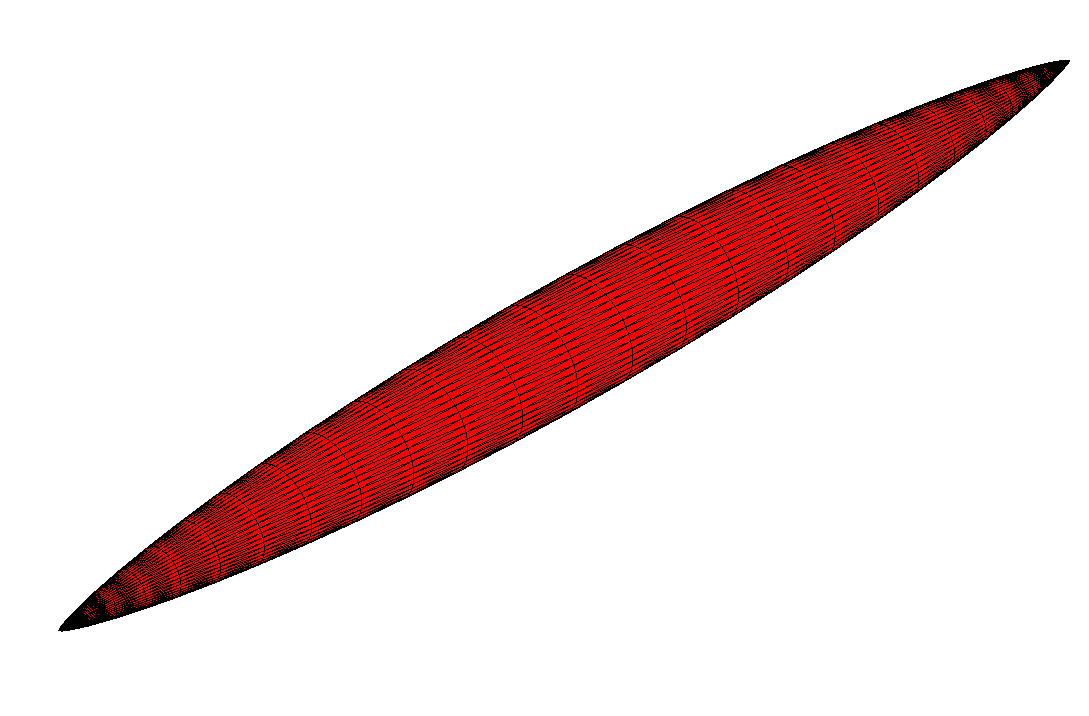
Sears–Haack body

The Sears–Haack body is the shape with the lowest theoretical wave drag in supersonic flow, for a slender solid body of revolution with a given body length and volume. The mathematical derivation assumes small-disturbance (linearized) supersonic flow, which is governed by the Prandtl–Glauert equation. The derivation and shape were published independently by two separate researchers: Wolfgang Haack in 1941 and later by William Sears in 1947.

The Kármán–Moore theory indicates that the wave drag scales as the square of the second derivative of the area distribution, $D_\text{wave} \sim \left[S''\left(x\right)\right]^2$ (see full expression below), so for low wave drag it is necessary that $S(x)$ be smooth. Thus, the Sears–Haack body is pointed at each end and grows smoothly to a maximum and then decreases smoothly toward the second point.

== Useful formulas ==
Because these formulas assume a slender body, they assume L >> 2R_{max} (i.e. a large fineness ratio f = L/2R_{max}), but no specific upper limit on R_{max} (or lower limit on fineness) is specified.
$$\begin{align}
R_\text{max} &= \frac{4}{\pi}\sqrt{\frac{V}{3L}}\\
V &= \frac {3\pi^2}{16}R_\text{max}^2L\\
L &= \frac{16V}{3\pi^2R_\text{max}^2}\\
f &:= \frac{L}{2R_\text{max}} = \frac{\pi}{8}\sqrt{\frac{3L^3}{V}} &&=\frac{8V}{3\pi^2R_\text{max}^3}\\
S_\text{max} &= \frac{16V}{3\pi L} &&= \pi R_\text{max}^2\\
S(x) &= \frac {128V}{3\pi L}\bigl(x(1-x)\bigr)^{3/2} &&= 8\pi R_\text{max}^2\bigl(x(1-x)\bigr)^{3/2}\\
r(x) &= \frac{8}{\pi}\sqrt{\frac{2V}{3L}}\bigl(x(1-x)\bigr)^{3/4} &&= 2\sqrt{2}R_\text{max}\bigl(x(1-x)\bigr)^{3/4}\\
r'(x) &= \frac{3R_\text{max}(1-2x)}{\sqrt{2}\sqrt[4]{x(1-x)}}, &&S'(x) = 12\pi R_\text{max}^2(1 - 2 x) \sqrt{x(1-x)}\\
r''(x) &= -\frac{3R_\text{max}\bigl(1+4x(1-x)\bigr)}{4\sqrt{2}\bigl(x(1-x)\bigr)^{5/4}}, &&S''(x) = -\frac{6\pi R_\text{max}^2 (8 (1-x) x - 1)}{\sqrt{x(1-x)}}\\
\end{align}$$

where:

- x is the ratio of the distance from the nose to the whole body length (this is always between 0 and 1),
- $r(x)$ is the local radius,
- $r'(x)$ is the local slope,
- $S(x)$ is the local cross-sectional area,
- $R_\text{max}$ is the radius at its maximum (occurs at x = 0.5, center of the shape),
- $S_\text{max}$ is the maximum cross-sectional area when x = 0.5 and $r(x)$ = $R_\text{max}$,
- V is the volume,
- L is the length,
- f is the fineness ratio.

From Kármán–Moore theory, it follows that:
$$D_\text{wave} = - \frac {1}{4 \pi} \rho U^2 \int_0^\ell \int_0^\ell S''(x_1) S''(x_2) \ln |x_1-x_2| \mathrm{d}x_1 \mathrm{d}x_2,$$

aIternatively:

$$D_\text{wave} = - \frac {1}{2 \pi} \rho U^2  \int_0^\ell  S''(x) \mathrm{d}x \int_0^x S''(x_1) \ln (x-x_1)  \mathrm{d}x_1.$$

These formulae may be combined to get the following:

$$\begin{align}
D_\text{wave} &= \frac{64 V^2}{\pi L^4} \rho U^2 &&= \frac {9\pi^3R_{max}^4}{4L^2}\rho U^2,\\
C_{D_\text{wave}} &= \frac {24V} {L^3} &&= \frac {9\pi^2R_{max}^2}{2L^2},\\
a &= \frac{64 V \rho}{\pi L^4 \rho_\text{b}} U^2 &&= \frac {12\pi R_{max}^2\rho}{L^3\rho_\text{b}} U^2,\\
\end{align}$$

where:

- $D_\text{wave}$ is the wave drag force,
- $C_{D_\text{wave}}$ is the drag coefficient (normaled by the dynamic pressure and frontal area),
- ρ is the density of the fluid,
- U is the velocity,
- ρ_{b} is the average density of the body,
- a is the magnitude of the acceleration due to the wave drag force.

Since the kinetic energy E of the body depends solely on its volume, density, and velocity, this can also be presented as:

$$\begin{align}
E &= \frac{\rho_\text{b}VU^2}{2} \Rightarrow U^2 = \frac{2E}{\rho_\text{b}V}\\
a &= \frac{128 \rho E}{\pi L^4 \rho_\text{b}^2}\\
\end{align}$$

== Derivation ==
According to Kármán–Moore theory, the wave drag force is given by

$$F = - \frac{\rho u^2}{2\pi} \int_0^l \int_0^{l} S''(\xi_1)S''(\xi_2)\ln|\xi_2-\xi_1|d\xi_1d\xi_2$$

where $S(x)$ is the cross-sectional area of the body perpendicular to the body axis; here $x=0$ represents the leading edge and $x=l$ is the trailing edge, although the Kármán–Moore theory does not distinguish these ends because the drag coefficient is independent of the direction of motion in the linear theory. Instead of $S(x)$, we can define the function $f(x)=S'(x)$ and expand it in series

$$\begin{align}
f(\theta) &= - l \sum_{n=2}^\infty A_n \sin n\theta\\
x(\theta) &= \frac{l}{2}(1-\cos\theta) = l\sin^2\left(\frac{\theta}{2}\right)\\
\theta(x) &= 3\pi-2\arccos\left(\sqrt{\frac{x}{l}}\right) = 2\pi + 2\arcsin\left(\sqrt{\frac{x}{l}}\right)\\
\end{align}$$

where $0\leq \theta \leq \pi,\ 0\leq x \leq l$. The series starts from $n=2$ because of the condition $S(0)=S(l)=0$. We have

$$\begin{align}
&S(x)=\int_0^x f(x) dx, \quad V = \int_0^l S(x) dx = \frac{\pi}{16} l^3 A_2\\
\end{align}$$

Note that the volume of the body depends only on the coefficient $A_2$.

To calculate the drag force, first we shall rewrite the drag force formula, by integrating by parts once,

$$F =  \mathrm{p. v.}\frac{\rho U^2}{2\pi} \int_0^l \int_0^{l} f(\xi_1)f'(\xi_2)\frac{d\xi_1d\xi_2}{\xi_1-\xi_2}$$

in which $\mathrm{p.v.}$ stands for Cauchy principal value. Now we can substitute the expansion for $f$ and integrate the expression using the following two identities

$$\mathrm{p. v.} \int_0^\pi \frac{\cos n\theta_2}{\cos\theta_2-\cos\theta_1}d\theta_2 = \frac{\pi \sin n\theta_1}{\sin\theta_1}, \quad \int_0^\pi \sin n\theta_1 \sin m\theta_1 d\theta_1 = \frac{\pi}{2}\begin{cases}1\,\,(m=n),\\ 0,\,\,(m\neq n).\end{cases}$$

The final result, expressed in terms of the drag coefficient C_{d}, is simply given by

$$\begin{align}
C_\mathrm d &= \frac{ 2F}{ \rho u^2 l^2}, l^2 = \text{area}\\
&= \frac{\pi}{4} \sum_{n=2}^\infty n A_n^2\\
\end{align}$$

Since $V$ depends only on $A_2$, the minimum value of $F$ is reached when $A_n=0$ for $n\geq 3$.

Thus, setting $A_n=0$ for $n\geq 3$, we obtain

$$\begin{align}
S &=\frac{l^3 A_2 \sin^3\theta}{3}\\
C_d &= \frac{128}{\pi} \left(\frac{V}{l^3}\right)^2=\frac{9\pi}{2} \left(\frac{S_{\mathrm{max}}}{l^2}\right)^2\\
r(x) &= \frac{8}{\pi l^2}\sqrt{\frac{2V}{3}}[x(l-x)]^\frac{3}{4} = \frac{8}{\pi}\sqrt{\frac{2V}{3l}}\left[\frac{x}{l}\left(1-\frac{x}{l}\right)\right]^\frac{3}{4}\\
\end{align}$$

where $r(x)$ is the radius as a function of x; the $\frac{x}{l}$ version shows the formula where x is relative to l, as in the useful formulas section above.

== Generalization by R. T. Jones ==
The Sears–Haack body shape derivation is correct only in the limit of a slender body. The theory has been generalized to slender but non-axisymmetric shapes by Robert T. Jones in NACA Report 1284. In this extension, the area $S(x)$ is defined on the Mach cone whose apex is at location $x$, rather than on the $x = \text{constant}$ plane as assumed by Sears and Haack. Hence, Jones's theory makes it applicable to more complex shapes like entire supersonic aircraft.

== Area rule ==
A superficially related concept is the Whitcomb area rule, which states that wave drag due to volume in transonic flow depends primarily on the distribution of total cross-sectional area, and for low wave drag this distribution must be smooth. A common misconception is that the Sears–Haack body has the ideal area distribution according to the area rule, but this is not correct. The Prandtl–Glauert equation, which is the starting point in the Sears–Haack body shape derivation, is not valid in transonic flow, which is where the area rule applies.

== See also ==
- Prandtl–Glauert transformation
- Aerodynamics
- Anti-shock body
- Haack series nose cone
- Area rule
- Lemon (geometry)
