= William R. Sears =

American aeronautical engineer and educator

- Born: March 1, 1913; Minneapolis, Minnesota, U.S.
- Died: October 12, 2002 (aged 89); Tucson, Arizona, U.S.
- Education: University of Minnesota (B.S., 1934); Caltech (PhD, 1938)
- Occupation: Aeronautical engineer
- Known for: Aeronautical Engineering; Sears–Haack body
- Spouse: Mabel Rhodes
- Children: Susan and David
- Awards: ASME Medal (1989); Fluid Dynamics Prize (APS) (1992); Daniel Guggenheim Medal (1996)

William Rees Sears (March 1, 1913 – October 12, 2002) was an American aeronautical engineer and educator who worked at Caltech, Northrop Aircraft, Cornell University (as the J. L. Given Professor of Engineering), and the University of Arizona. He was an editor of the Journal of the Aeronautical Sciences from 1955 to 1963 and the founding Editor of the Annual Review of Fluid Mechanics in 1969.

== Career ==
William R. Sears was born in Minneapolis, Minnesota, the son of William and Gertrude Sears. He earned his BS degree from the University of Minnesota in 1934. Following this, he enrolled at Caltech to study under Theodore von Kármán, director of the Guggenheim Aeronautical Laboratory (GALCIT). There he met von Kármán's secretary, Mabel Rhodes and they were soon married. Sears earned his PhD in 1938, writing a thesis concerning airfoils in non-steady motion, a work that laid the foundations for future developments in that field.

In 1937, Sears was appointed instructor in aeronautics at Caltech, and in 1940, he was promoted to assistant professor. Several of his colleagues in these years included Qian Xuesen and Frank Malina. Through von Kármán's friendship with Jack Northrop, Sears became involved in consulting on aerodynamic problems at Northrop Aircraft In 1941, Sears accepted Jack Northrop's offer to be chief of aerodynamics and flight testing.

While a junior faculty member at Caltech, Sears directed the Civilian Pilot Training Program, a federal program that offered young people the possibility of earning a private pilot's license and receiving preparation for possible military flying in the event that the United States entered a war. Sears not only administered the program but took the opportunity to get his own pilot's license.

At Northrop, Sears headed the team that designed the Northrop N-1M, which eventually led to the Northrop N9M, Northrop XB-35 and Northrop YB-49 flying wing aircraft. He also led the team that developed the Northrop P-61 Black Widow. At the end of World War II, he accompanied a group of aeronautical experts led by Von Kármán to Germany to investigate the German progress in aerodynamics research.

Sears chose to return to academic life in 1946 by joining the faculty of Cornell University as its founder and first director of Cornell's Graduate School of Aeronautical Engineering. Within a few years, the Cornell Graduate School of Aeronautical Engineering was ranked amongst the world's best. Sears and his many students pioneered research in wing theory, unsteady flow, magnetohydrodynamics, and designed a sophisticated wind tunnel design to study transonic flight. He remained very close to von Kármán, who was a frequent visitor to the Cornell aero school.

In 1962, Sears was named the J. L. Given Professor of Engineering, and in 1963, he stepped down as director of the aero school after 17 years. A year earlier he had founded and became director of Cornell's Center of Applied Mathematics.

Although his work at Northrop offered him little opportunity to fly, his move to Cornell provided more opportunities. In more than 50 years as a private pilot, he logged 8,000 hours before retiring from flying in 1990. He owned several aircraft over the years, including a Mooney M-18 Mite, a Beech A35 Bonanza, a Piper Comanche and finally a Piper Twin Comanche.

In 1974, after 28 years at Cornell, Sears joined the faculty of the aerospace and mechanical engineering departments at the University of Arizona. Four years later, he was named emeritus professor but remained an active faculty member and completed much of his important analytical and experimental work on adaptive-wall wind tunnels during these years.

== Honors and awards ==
Sears was a member of the National Academy of Sciences, the National Academy of Engineering, the American Academy of Arts and Sciences, and Mexico's Academia Nacional de Ingeniería. He was an honorary fellow of the American Institute of Aeronautics and Astronautics. During his lifetime, he received many honors and awards, including the Guggenheim Medal and in 1974 the Ludwig-Prandtl-Ring from the Deutsche Gesellschaft für Luft- und Raumfahrt (German Society for Aeronautics and Astronautics) for "outstanding contribution in the field of aerospace engineering." In 1988, Caltech gave him its Distinguished Alumni Award. He was also named an outstanding alumnus of the University of Minnesota and was awarded an honorary doctorate from the University of Arizona. He was awarded the Pendray Aerospace Literature Award by the AIAA in 1975.

Sears was also an accomplished musician, first as a percussionist. He worked his way through college as a drummer in dance bands and, after moving to California, was tympanist with the Pasadena Symphony for several seasons. Later, at Cornell, he became an expert recorder player with a university group interested in medieval music. He played with the Collegium Musicum at the University of Arizona for 20 years.
