= Scientific Advisory Group =

The Scientific Advisory Group of the United States Air Force, later renamed the Scientific Advisory Board, was established in 1944, when General Henry H. Arnold asked Dr. Theodore von Kármán to establish a group of scientists to review the techniques and research trends in aeronautics. The group was asked to evaluate the aeronautical research and development programs and facilities of the Axis powers of World War II, and to provide recommendations for future United States Air Force research and development programs.

Von Kármán picked the following scientists for initial members of the group: Hugh Dryden, Frank Wattendorf, Hsue-shen Tsien, T. F. Walkowicz, George S. Schairer, G.E. Valley, Ivan A. Getting, Edward Mills Purcell, Vladimir K. Zworykin, Lee DuBridge, and Norman Ramsey.

Under von Kármán the group put together several reports for General Arnold, including, "Where We Stand" and "Toward New Horizons." General Arnold's vision and Dr. von Kármán's reports led to American airpower dominance and the establishment of the Air Engineering Development Center later renamed and dedicated as the Arnold Engineering Development Center (AEDC) in 1951.

== See also ==
- USAF Scientific Advisory Board
