= Kármán–Moore theory =

Supersonic flow past a slender body

Kármán–Moore theory is a linearized theory for supersonic flows over a slender body, named after Theodore von Kármán and Norton B. Moore, who developed the theory in 1932. The theory, in particular, provides an explicit formula for the wave drag, which converts the kinetic energy of the moving body into outgoing sound waves behind the body.

== Mathematical description ==
Consider a slender body with pointed edges at the front and back. The supersonic flow past this body will be nearly parallel to the $x$-axis everywhere since the shock waves formed (one at the leading edge and one at the trailing edge) will be weak; as a consequence, the flow will be potential everywhere, which can be described using the velocity potential $\varphi = xv_1 + \phi$, where $v_1$ is the incoming uniform velocity and $\phi$ characterising the small deviation from the uniform flow. In the linearized theory, $\phi$ satisfies

$$\begin{align}
\frac{\partial^2\phi}{\partial y^2} + \frac{\partial^2\phi}{\partial z^2} - \beta^2 \frac{\partial^2\phi}{\partial x^2} =0 \\
\beta^2=(v_1^2-c_1^2)/c_1^2=M_1^2-1
\end{align}$$

where $c_1$ is the sound speed in the incoming flow and $M_1$ is the Mach number of the incoming flow. This is just the two-dimensional wave equation and $\phi$ is a disturbance propagated with an apparent time $x/v_1$ and with an apparent velocity $v_1/\beta$.

Let the origin $(x,y,z)=(0,0,0)$ be located at the leading end of the pointed body. Further, let $S(x)$ be the cross-sectional area (perpendicular to the $x$-axis) and $l$ be the length of the slender body, so that $S(x)=0$ for $x<0$ and for $x>l$. Of course, in supersonic flows, disturbances (i.e., $\phi$) can be propagated only into the region behind the Mach cone. The weak Mach cone for the leading-edge is given by $x-\beta r=0$, whereas the weak Mach cone for the trailing edge is given by $x-\beta r = l$, where $r^2=y^2+z^2$ is the squared radial distance from the $x$-axis.

The disturbance far away from the body is just like a cylindrical wave propagation. In front of the cone $x-\beta r=0$, the solution is simply given by $\phi=0$. Between the cones $x-\beta r = 0$ and $x-\beta r = l$, or behind the cone at $x-\beta r > l$, the solution is given by

$$\phi(x,r) =
\begin{cases}
0, &0 \ge x-\beta r\\
-\frac{v_1}{2\pi} \int_0^{x-\beta r}\frac{S'(\xi)}{\sqrt{(x-\xi)^2-\beta^2r^2}}d\xi, &l \ge x-\beta r > 0\\
-\frac{v_1}{2\pi} \int_0^{l}\frac{S'(\xi)}{\sqrt{(x-\xi)^2-\beta^2r^2}}d\xi, &l \le x-\beta r\\
\end{cases}$$

The solution described above is exact for all $r$ when the slender body is a solid of revolution. If this is not the case, the solution is only valid at large distances, which will have correction associated with the non-linear distortion of the shock profile, whose strength is proportional to $\sqrt[8]\frac{M_1-1}{r^6}$ and a factor depending on the shape function $S(x)$.

The drag force $F$ is just the $x$-component of the momentum per unit time. To calculate this, consider a cylindrical surface with a large radius and with an axis along the $x$-axis. The momentum flux density crossing through this surface is simply given by $\Pi_{xr}=\rho v_r (v_1+v_x)\approx \rho_1 (\partial\phi/\partial r)(v_1+\partial\phi/\partial x)$. Integrating $\Pi_{xr}$ over the cylindrical surface gives the drag force. Due to symmetry, the first term in $\Pi_{xr}$ upon integration gives zero since the net mass flux $\rho v_r$ is zero on the cylindrical surface considered. The second term gives the non-zero contribution,

$$F = -2\pi r \rho_1 \int_{-\infty}^\infty \frac{\partial \phi}{\partial r}\frac{\partial\phi}{\partial x} dx.$$

At large distances, the values $x-\xi \sim \beta r$ (the wave region) are the most important in the solution for $\phi$; this is because, as mentioned earlier, $\phi$ is a like disturbance propating with a speed $v_1/\beta$ with an apparent time $x/v_1$. This means that we can approximate the expression in the denominator as $(x-\xi)^2-\beta^2r^2\approx 2\beta r (x-\xi-\beta r).$ Then we can write, for example,

$$\begin{align}
\phi(x,r) &= - \frac{v_1}{2\pi\sqrt{2\beta r}}\int_0^{x-\beta r} \frac{S'(\xi)d\xi}{\sqrt{x-\xi-\beta r}}\\
&= - \frac{v_1}{2\pi\sqrt{2\beta r}}\int_0^{\infty} \frac{S'(x-\beta r-s)ds}{\sqrt{s}} &\begin{cases}
s = x-\xi-\beta r\\
r \gg 1\\
\end{cases}
\end{align}$$

From this expression, we can calculate $\partial\phi/\partial r$, which is also equal to $-\beta\partial\phi/\partial x$ since we are in the wave region. The factor $1/\sqrt r$ appearing in front of the integral need not be differentiated since this gives rise to a small correction proportional to $1/r$. Effecting the differentiation and returning to the original variables, we find

$$\frac{\partial \phi}{\partial r} = -\beta \frac{\partial \phi}{\partial x}= \frac{v_1}{2\pi}\sqrt{\frac{\beta}{2r}}\int_0^{x-\beta r} \frac{S''(\xi)d\xi}{\sqrt{x-\xi-\beta r}}.$$

Substituting this in the drag force formula gives us

$$F = \frac{\rho_1 v_1^2}{4\pi} \int_{-\infty}^\infty \int_0^X \int_0^X \frac{S''(\xi_1)S''(\xi_2) d\xi_1d\xi_2dX}{\sqrt{(X-\xi_1)(X-\xi_2)}}, \quad X=x-\beta r.$$

This can be simplified by carrying out the integration over $X$. When the integration order is changed, the limit for $X$ ranges from the $\mathrm{max}(\xi_1,\xi_2)$ to $L\to\infty$. Upon integration, we have

$$F = - \frac{\rho_1 v_1^2}{2\pi} \int_0^l \int_0^{\xi_2} S''(\xi_1)S''(\xi_2)\bigl(\ln(\xi_2-\xi_1)-\ln(4L)\bigr)d\xi_1d\xi_2.$$

The integral containing the term $L$ is zero because $S'(0)=S'(l)=0$ (of course, in addition to $S(0)=S(l)=0$).

The final formula for the wave drag force may be written as

$$\begin{align}
F &= - \frac{\rho_1 v_1^2}{2\pi} \int_0^l \int_0^{\xi_2} S''(\xi_1)S''(\xi_2)\ln(\xi_2-\xi_1)d\xi_1d\xi_2\\
&= - \frac{\rho_1 v_1^2}{2\pi} \int_0^l \int_0^{l} S''(\xi_1)S''(\xi_2)\ln|\xi_2-\xi_1|d\xi_1d\xi_2
\end{align}$$

The drag coefficient is then given by

$$C_d = \frac{2F}{\rho_1^2 v_1^2 l^2}.$$

Since $F\sim \rho_1 v_1^2 S^2/l^2$ that follows from the formula derived above, $C_d \sim S^2/l^4$, indicating that the drag coefficient is proportional to the square of the cross-sectional area and inversely proportional to the fourth power of the body length.

The shape with smallest wave drag for a given volume $V$ and length $l$ can be obtained from the wave drag force formula. This shape is known as the Sears–Haack body.

== See also ==
- Taylor–Maccoll flow
