= Frank Wattendorf =

American aerodynamicist (1906 to 1986)

Frank Wattendorf (1906 – 11 June 1986) was an American physicist specializing in wind tunnels for research in aerodynamics.

Wattendorf is recalled for his report on a wind tunnel that was under construction in Ötztal in Austria during World War II. Wattendorf's report, and one by Theodore von Kármán, spurred on renewed research in aerodynamics.

Wattendorf was born in Boston on May 23, 1906. He studied at Harvard University, graduating in 1926. He went on to study aerodynamics at MIT and there met Kármán when he visited that campus. Kármán invited him to come to Aachen, Germany which he did, with his mother.

Wattendorf became Kármán's assistant, and they both moved to Caltech in 1926. Wattendorf earned his Ph.D. in California. His thesis, "The effect of curvature on fully developed turbulent flow", was published in the Proceedings of the Royal Society (series A, volume 148, issue #865). The colleagues combined to study the landing of seaplanes in 1929.

In 1937 Wattendorf was at Tsing Hua University organizing an aeronautical engineering department and building a wind tunnel. He invited Karman for a visit, but Karman decided to visit Russia first, and enter China through Manchuria.

Frank Wattendorf was on hand when I finally walked through customs. It was invigorating to see him after the long trip. He told me that he had been living in the beach town of Peitaho near the Manchurian border for a week and that each day he came to meet the train because he wasn’t sure when the Russian railway system would deliver me.

After the University visit they took a train to Shanghai just as the Second Sino-Japanese War started. They met Chiang Kai-shek, his wife, and generals. Then they left China for Japan and Tokyo Imperial University. Shortly, Wattendorf returned to Japanese-occupied Peking and the precious wind tunnel.

In the wake of the bombings pestilence broke out in China, and Wattendorf came down with a terrible disease which left him paralyzed from the waist down. He was taken to a hospital in Changsha, created by Yale University and called Yale-in-China. Madame Chiang came to Frank’s rescue, after she heard about his illness from his Tsing Hua colleagues who had stayed with him throughout the ordeal. I heard that she was able by Christmas 1937 to get a German barnstorming plane to bring him to Hong Kong, where he could make connection in January for a ship to the States. Frank recovered from the paralysis, but he still walks with a limp.

In 1945 Wattendorf proposed the Arnold Engineering Development Center to The Pentagon. He was named Civilian Chairman of the AEDC Planning Group and in 1950 was posted to The Pentagon as Deputy Chief Scientific Advisor of the Air Engineering Development Division. The Center, near Tullahoma, Tennessee, was dedicated in a ceremony by President Truman in 1952. The highway connecting Arnold Air Force Base to the surrounding communities of Manchester, Hillsboro, and Tullahoma, Tennessee also bears his name.

He was a member of the Scientific Advisory Group and the NATO Advisory Group for Aeronautical Research and Development (AGARD). He died in Washington, DC on June 11, 1986.

== Awards ==
Wattendorf was recognized for his work as consultant.

- 1946: Exceptional Civilian Service, War Department medal
- 1952: Medal of Freedom, planning Arnold Engineering Development Center
- 1968: USAF medal for Exceptional Civilian Service, Scientific Advisory Board
- 1979: Ground Test Facilities Medal, American Institute of Aeronautics and Astronautics
