= Theodore von Kármán =

Hungarian-American mathematician, aerospace engineer and physicist (1881–1963)

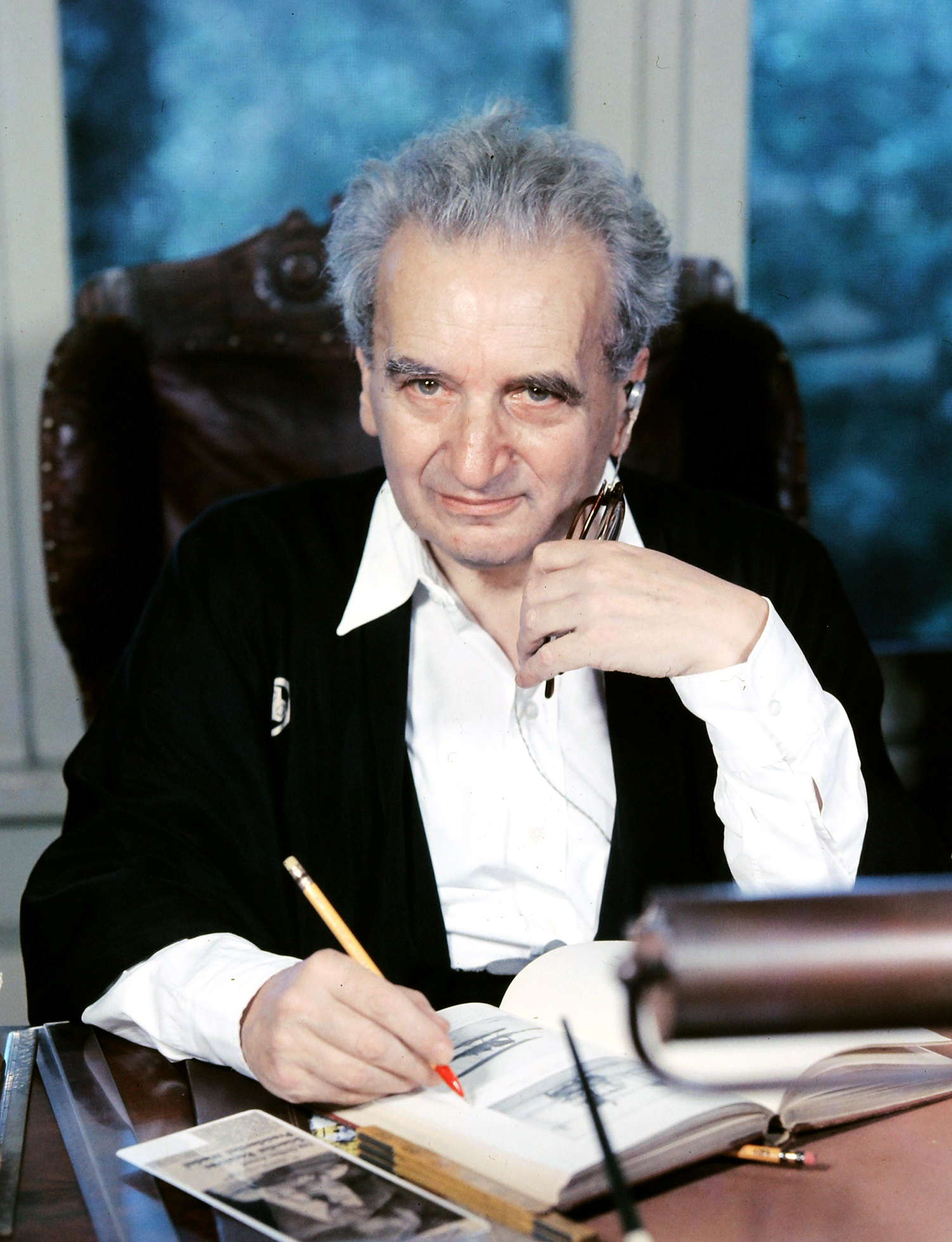
- Von Kármán in 1957
- Born: May 11, 1881; Budapest, Austria-Hungary
- Died: May 6, 1963 (aged 81); Aachen, West Germany
- Resting place: Hollywood Forever Cemetery; Hollywood, California U.S.
- Citizenship: Hungary; United States
- Education: Budapest University of Technology and Economics; University of Göttingen
- Known for: See list: Kármán vortex street; von Kármán constant; von Kármán swirling flow; von Kármán momentum integral; Kármán–Moore theory; Kármán–Moore solution; Kármán line; Kármán–Howarth equation; Law of the wall; Supersonic and hypersonic airflow characterization
- Awards: ASME Medal (1941); AAES John Fritz Medal (1948); ASME Thurston Lecture Award (1950); Wright Brothers Memorial Trophy (1954); Daniel Guggenheim Medal (1955); Timoshenko Medal (1958); National Medal of Science (1962); Wilhelm Exner Medal (1962); Foreign Member of the Royal Society
- Scientific career
- Fields: Aerospace engineering
- Workplaces: University of Göttingen; RWTH Aachen; California Institute of Technology; von Karman Institute for Fluid Dynamics
- Thesis: Investigations on buckling strength (1908)
- Doctoral advisor: Ludwig Prandtl
- Doctoral students: Giuseppe Gabrielli (1926); Wolfgang Klemperer (1926); Richard G. Folsom (1932); Maurice Anthony Biot (1932); Frank Wattendorf (1933); Ernest Sechler (1934); Arthur T. Ippen (1936); Qian Xuesen (1939); Louis Dunn (1940); Frank Malina (1940); Homer J. Stewart (1940); Hu Ning (1943); Guo Yonghuai (1944); Chia-Chiao Lin (1944); Wallace D. Hayes (1947); Frank E. Marble (1947)

Theodore von Kármán (Hungarian: (szőllőskislaki) Kármán Tódor [(søːløːʃkiʃlɒki) ˈkaːrmaːn ˈtoːdor], May 11, 1881 – May 6, 1963) was a Hungarian-American mathematician, aerospace engineer, and physicist who worked in aeronautics and astronautics. He was responsible for crucial advances in aerodynamics characterizing supersonic and hypersonic airflow. The defined threshold of outer space is named the "Kármán line" in recognition of his work. Kármán is regarded as an outstanding aerodynamic theoretician of the 20th century.

== Early life ==
Theodore von Kármán was born into a Jewish family in Budapest, then part of Austria-Hungary, as Kármán Tódor, the son of Helene (Konn or Kohn, Hungarian: Kohn Ilka) and Mór Kármán. Among his ancestors were Rabbi Judah Loew ben Bezalel, who was said to be the creator of the Golem of Prague, and Rabbi Moses Kunitz, who wrote about the Zohar. His father, Mór, was a well-known educator, who reformed the Hungarian school system and founded Minta Gymnasium in Budapest. He became an influential figure and became a commissioner of the Ministry of Education, and was responsible for "planning an education of a young archduke, the Emperor's cousin". In 1907 Mór Kármán was ennobled, Theodore later described it:

To receive a predicate of nobility, my father had to be landed. Fortunately he owned a small vineyard near Budapest, so the Emperor bestowed upon him the predicate "von Szőllőskislaki" (small grape). I have shortened it to von, for even to me, a Hungarian, the full title is almost unpronounceable.

Theodore had three brothers (among them Elemér Kármán) and one sister, Josephine. At age six, he could "perform large mental calculations", for example multiplication of six-digit numbers. His father discouraged Theodore's mathematical education, as he was afraid his son would be a child prodigy and a freak. He was tutored by his father and his father's former student; later he entered the Minta Gymnasium in Budapest. He won Eötvös Prize "for the best student in mathematics and science in the whole of Hungary" in his last year at Minta. (Note: von Kármán's own recollections about the prize and competition: "Selected students were kept in a closed room and given difficult mathematics problems, which demanded creative and even daring thinking. The teacher of the pupil who won the prize would gain great distinction, so the competition was keen and teachers worked hard to prepare their best students. I tried out for this prize against students of great attainments, and to my delight I managed to win. Now, I note that more than half of all the famous expatriate Hungarian scientists, and almost all the well-known ones in the United States, have won this prize.")

He studied engineering at the city's Royal Joseph Technical University (Budapest University of Technology and Economics). He graduated in 1902 with a degree in mechanical engineering, his thesis was "The motion of a heavy rod supported on its rounded end by a horizontal plane". He then served a year as an artillery cadet in the Austro-Hungarian army. In 1903-1906 he worked as an assistant at the Royal Joseph Technical University. In 1906 he moved to the German Empire and joined Ludwig Prandtl at the University of Göttingen, where he received his doctorate in 1908, for his research on "mathematical models for the buckling of large structures". He taught at Göttingen for four years. In 1913 he accepted a position as director of the Aeronautical Institute at RWTH Aachen University, a leading German university. His time at RWTH Aachen was interrupted by service in the Austro-Hungarian Army from 1915 to 1918, during World War I, when he designed the Petróczy-Kármán-Žurovec, an early helicopter.

After the war, in 1919, he returned to Aachen with his mother and sister Josephine. Some of his students took an interest in gliding and saw the competitions of the Rhön-Rossitten Gesellschaft as an opportunity to advance in aeronautics. Kármán engaged Wolfgang Klemperer to design a competitive glider.

Josephine encouraged her brother Theodore to expand his science beyond national boundaries. They organized the first international conference in mechanics held in September 1922 in Innsbruck. Subsequent conferences were organized as the International Union of Theoretical and Applied Mechanics.

In 1926, von Kármán was first invited to the US by the California Institute of Technology to build a wind tunnel. In 1930 he was invited for a position of a full-time director of the Guggenheim Aeronautical Laboratory at California Institute of Technology (GALCIT); his mother and sister, Josephine, also moved to California.

== Emigration and JPL ==
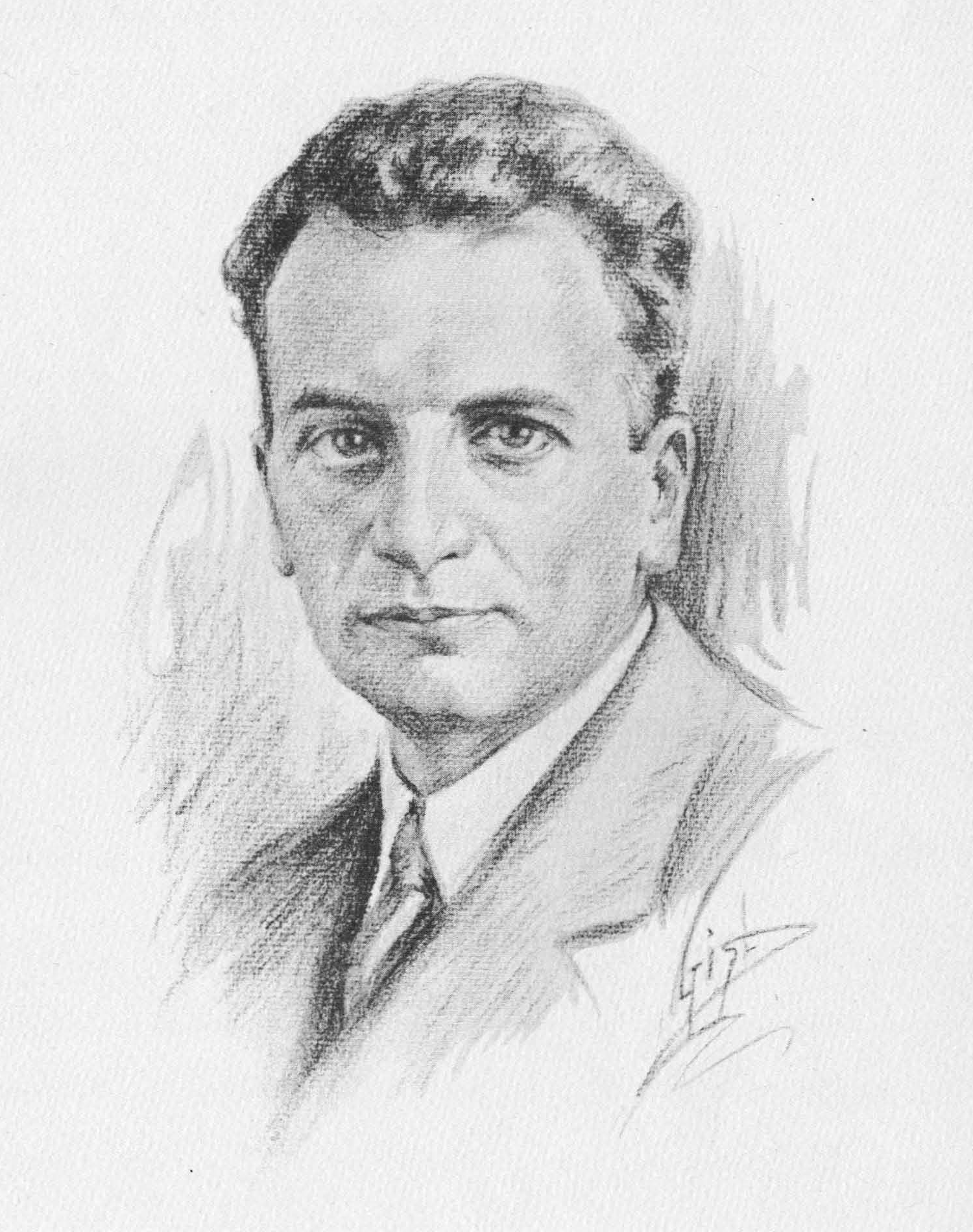
1931 drawing of Theodore von Kármán

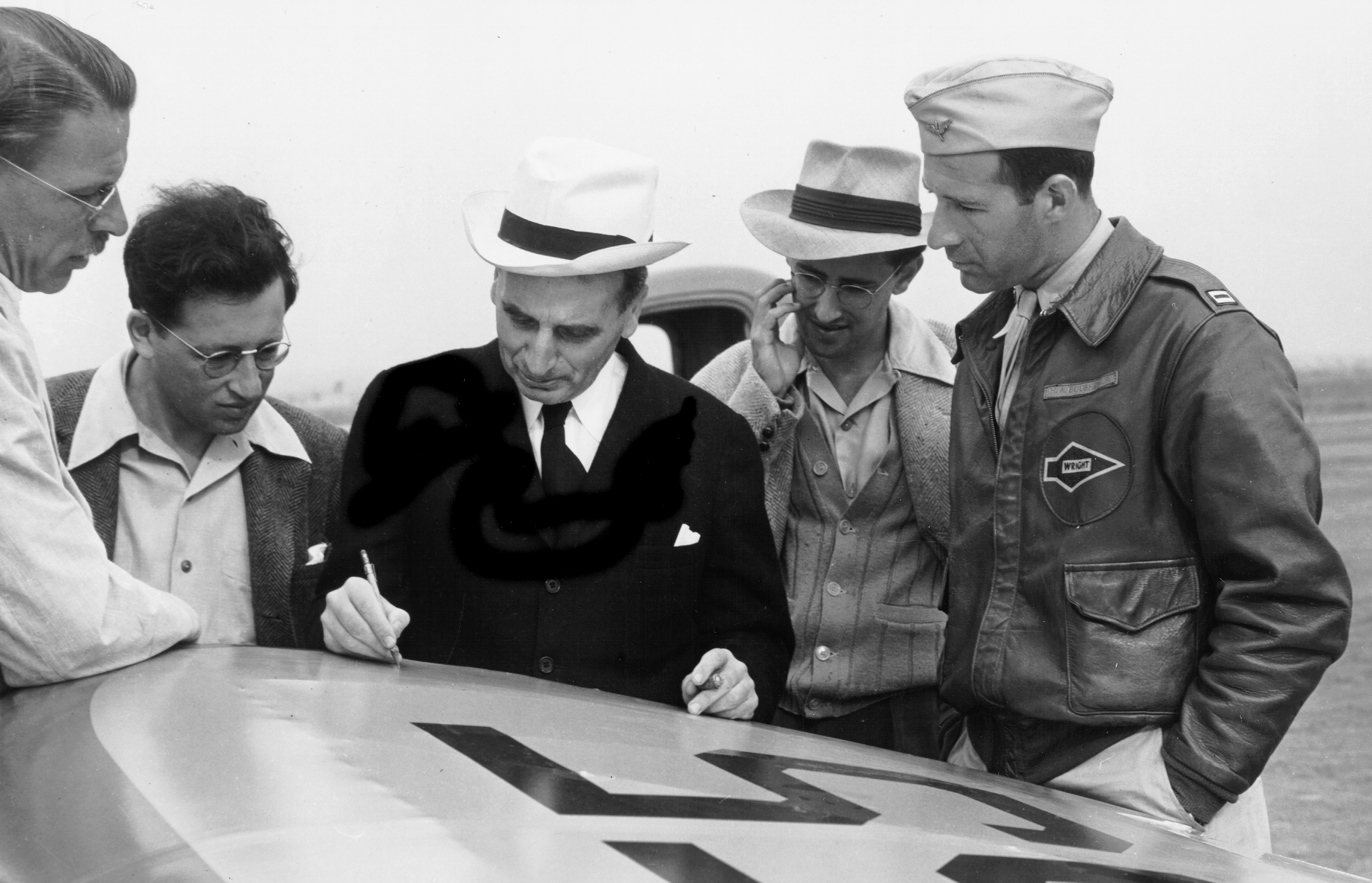
Von Kármán (center) during his work at the Jet Propulsion Laboratory in 1940

Apprehensive about developments in Europe regarding Nazism, in 1930 Kármán accepted the directorship of the Guggenheim Aeronautical Laboratory at the California Institute of Technology (GALCIT). The directorship included provision for a research assistant, and he selected Frank Wattendorf, an American who had been studying for three years in Aachen.

Another student Ernest Edwin Sechler took up the problem of making reliable airframes for aircraft, and with von Kármán's support, developed an understanding of aeroelasticity.

The US Army Air Force wanted Caltech to manufacture JATO rockets, but Caltech was not interested in operating in industry. In 1936, von Kármán engaged the legal services of Andrew G. Haley to form the Aerojet Corporation, with his graduate student Frank Malina and their experimental rocketry collaborators Jack Parsons and Edward Forman to manufacture JATO rocket motors. von Kármán later became a naturalized citizen of the United States.

In 1940, von Kármán was selected by John M. Carmody, Administrator of the Federal Works Agency to be on the Board of Engineers tasked with investigating the November 7, 1940, collapse of the Tacoma Narrows Bridge outside Tacoma, Washington. His expertise was instrumental in discovering the effect of aerodynamic forces on the bridge, causing its unusual "galloping" behavior and eventual collapse. Along with Civil Engineers Othmar Amman and Glenn B. Woodruff, he published the report "The Failure of the Tacoma Narrows Bridge" on March 28, 1941.

German activity during World War II increased US military interest in rocket research. In early 1943, the Experimental Engineering Division of the United States Army Air Forces Material Command forwarded to von Kármán reports from British intelligence sources describing German rockets capable of travelling more than 100 miles (160 km). In a letter dated August 2, 1943, von Kármán provided the Army with his analysis of and comments on the German program.

In 1944 he and others affiliated with GALCIT founded the Jet Propulsion Laboratory (JPL), which is now a federally funded research and development center managed and operated by Caltech under a contract from NASA. In 1946 he became the first chairman of the Scientific Advisory Group which studied aeronautical technologies for the United States Army Air Forces. He also helped found AGARD, the NATO aerodynamics research oversight group (1951), the International Council of the Aeronautical Sciences (1956), the International Academy of Astronautics (1960), and the Von Karman Institute for Fluid Dynamics in Sint-Genesius-Rode, south of Brussels (1956).

He eventually became an important figure in supersonic motion, noting in a seminal paper that aeronautical engineers were "pounding hard on the closed door leading into the field of supersonic motion."

== Last years ==
In June 1944, von Kármán underwent surgery for intestinal cancer in New York City. The surgery caused two hernias, and von Kármán's recovery was slow. Early in September, while still in New York, he met US Army Air Forces Commanding General Henry H. Arnold on a runway at LaGuardia Airport, and Arnold then proposed that von Kármán should move to Washington, D.C., to lead the Scientific Advisory Group and become a long-range planning consultant to the military. von Kármán returned to Pasadena around mid-September, was appointed to the SAG position on October 23, 1944, and left Caltech in December 1944.

At the age of 81 von Kármán was the recipient of the first National Medal of Science, bestowed in a White House ceremony by President John F. Kennedy. He was recognized, "For his leadership in the science and engineering basic to aeronautics; for his effective teaching and related contributions in many fields of mechanics, for his distinguished counsel to the Armed Services, and for his promoting international cooperation in science and engineering."

von Kármán never married. He died on a trip to Aachen, West Germany, in 1963, five days short of his 82nd birthday, and his body was returned to the United States to be entombed in the Beth Olam Mausoleum at what is now the Hollywood Forever Cemetery. He has sometimes been described as one of The Martians.

von Kármán's fame was in the use of mathematical tools to study fluid flow, and the interpretation of those results to guide practical designs. He was instrumental in recognizing the importance of swept-back wings ubiquitous in modern jet aircraft.

== Selected contributions ==
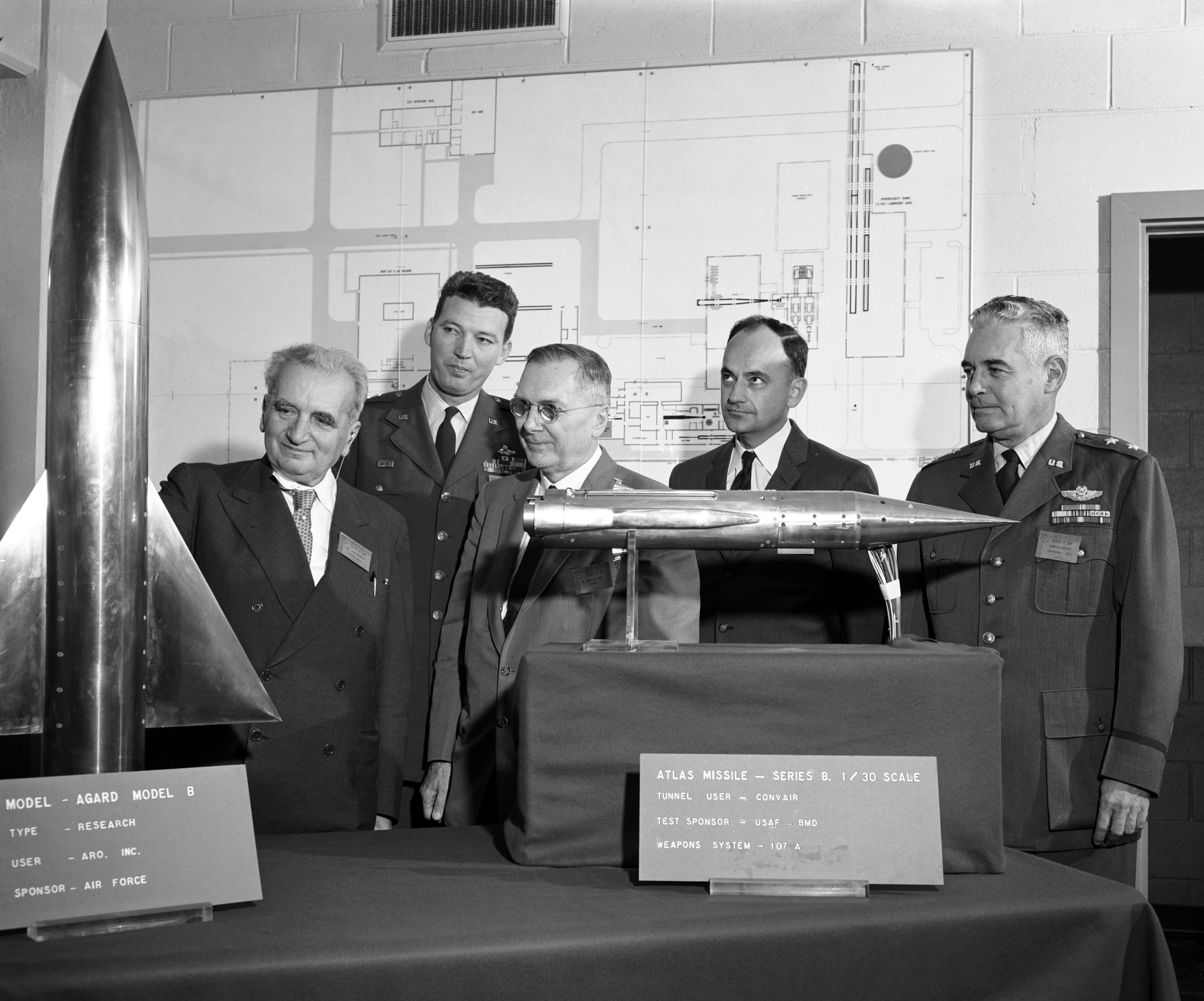
Theodore von Kármán, left, is joined by Air Force and NASA officials while inspecting two of the models used in the high velocity, high altitude wind tunnels at Arnold Air Force Base, 1959. The missiles are Agard-B and Atlas Series B.

Specific contributions include theories of non-elastic buckling, unsteady wakes in circum-cylinder flow, stability of laminar flow, turbulence, airfoils in steady and unsteady flow, boundary layers, and supersonic aerodynamics. He made additional contributions in other fields, including elasticity, vibration, heat transfer, and crystallography. His name also appears in a number of concepts, for example:

- Föppl–von Kármán equations (large deflection of elastic plates)
- Born–von Karman boundary condition (in solid state physics)
- Born–von Kármán lattice model (model for the lattice dynamics of a crystal)
- Chaplygin–Kármán–Tsien approximation (potential flow)
- Falkowich–Kármán equation (transonic flow)
- von Kármán constant (wall turbulence)
- Kármán–Moore theory
- Kármán–Moore solution
- Kármán line (aerodynamics/astronautics)
- von Kármán–Gabrielli diagram (transportation)
- Kármán–Howarth equation (turbulence)
- Kármán–Penner flux fraction (combustion)
- Kármán–Nikuradse correlation (viscous flow; coauthored by Johann Nikuradse)
- Kármán–Pohlhausen parameter (boundary layers)
- Kármán–Treffz transform
- Prandtl–von Kármán law (velocity in open channel flow)
- Von Kármán momentum integral
- von Kármán ogive (supersonic aerodynamics)
- von Kármán strain
- von Kármán vortex street (flow past cylinder)
- von Kármán wind turbulence model
- von Kármán–Tsien compressibility correction
- Vortex shedding
- Von Kármán swirling flow

== Selected writings ==
=== Books ===
- von Kármán, Theodore; Burgers, J. M. (1924). General Aerodynamic Theory. 2 vols., Julius Springer.
- von Kármán, Theodore; Biot, M. A. (1940). Mathematical Methods in Engineering; An introduction to the Mathematical Treatment of Engineering Problems. McGraw-Hill. pp. 505. ASIN B0006AOTLK.
- von Kármán, Theodore; Biot, M. A. (2004). Aerodynamics: Selected Topics in the Light of Their Historical Development. Dover Books on Aeronautical Engineering. Dover Publications. p. 224. ISBN 978-0-486-43485-8.
- von Kármán, Theodore (1956). Collected Works of Dr. T. von Kármán (1902–1951). 4 vols., Butterworth Scientific Publications.
- von Kármán, Theodore (1961). From Low-Speed Aerodynamics to Astronautics. Pergamon Press. ASIN B000H4OVPO.
- von Kármán, Theodore; Edson, L. (1967). The Wind and Beyond—T. von Kármán Pioneer in Aviation and Pathfinder in Space. Little Brown. p. 376. ISBN 978-0-316-90753-8.

=== Autobiography ===
Four years after von Kármán died his autobiography The Wind and Beyond was published by Lee Edson with Little, Brown and Company. Seven major academic journals then followed with book reviews by noted authors: As the book was non-technical, written for the general reader, Thomas P. Hughes cited that as problematic given the technical context of von Kármán's work. Hughes conceded that von Kármán "exhibited a genius for finding the simplifying assumptions that made possible the mathematical analysis." While acknowledging von Kármán's gifts as an applied mathematician and teacher, Stanley Corrsin points out that the autobiography is "marriage between a man and his ego." In the later part of his life, von Kármán was a "planner of global symposia and societies" and a "consultant to the upper echelons of the Pentagon corps."

On creativity, von Kármán wrote "the finest creative thought comes not out of organized teams but out of the quiet of one's own world." In his review I. B. Holley noted "penetrating insights into the creative process, its ingredients, nurture and exploitation." According to Holley, von Kármán was given to "convivial drinking and the company of beautiful women."

An enthusiastic review by J. Kestin advised readers to buy and study the book, and prize it as a reference. On the other hand, Charles Süsskind faults von Kármán for his contempt for the conventional (gaminarie). Süsskind expected the book to show some reaction to Wernher von Braun's coming to America, and some clarification of the Hsue-shen Tsien affair, rather than "lapses into generalities". Süsskind also tags von Kármán as a militarist: a "forthright engineer who is quite unabashed about his lifelong association with military authorities in whatever country he happened to reside at the time."

Sydney Goldstein, who also wrote the Royal Society memoir for von Kármán, reviewed the autobiography and remembered "an eminent engineer and scientist, warm-hearted and witty, much traveled, well-known by many, devoted to international collaboration, who, in his own words, as a scientist found the military 'the most comfortable group to deal with'".

== Honors and legacy ==
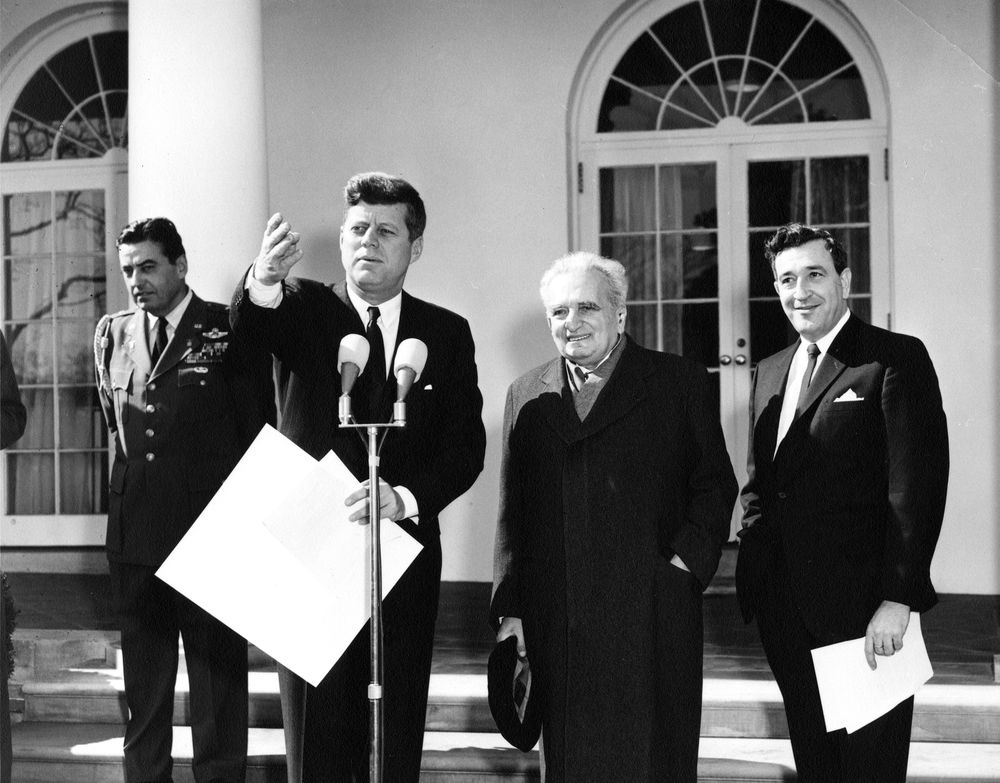
Presentation of the National Medal of Science to Theodore von Kármán by President Kennedy.

- von Kármán was elected to the United States National Academy of Sciences in 1938, the American Philosophical Society in 1941, and the American Academy of Arts and Sciences in 1948.
- Each year since 1960 the American Society of Civil Engineers has awarded to an individual the Theodore von Karman Medal, "in recognition of distinguished achievement in engineering mechanics."
- Established in 1968, the Theodore von Kármán Prize has been awarded by the Society for Industrial and Applied Mathematics to recognize outstanding application of mathematics in mechanics or engineering.
- In 1968, von Kármán was inducted into the International Air & Space Hall of Fame.
- Established in 1983, the Theodore von Kármán Award has been awarded annually by the International Academy of Astronautics to recognize outstanding lifetime achievements in any branch of science without limit of nationality or sex.
- In 2005 von Kármán was named as an Honorary Fellow of the Arnold Engineering Development Center (AEDC). Fellows of the AEDC are recognized as "People who have made exceptionally distinguished contributions to the center's flight testing mission."
- Craters on Mars and the Moon are named in his honor.
- The boundary between the atmosphere and space is named the Kármán line.
- In Irvine, CA there is a five-mile street in the heart of Irvine's business center named after him.
- In 1977, RWTH Aachen University named its newly constructed main lecture hall complex "Kármán-Auditorium" in memory of von Kármán's outstanding research contributions at the university's Aeronautical Institute.
- An auditorium at JPL is named after von Kármán, as is a series of monthly lectures held there since 2007.
- An auditorium at AFRL is named after Arnold and von Kármán.
- University of Southern California Professor Shirley Thomas (after nearly two decades of petitioning) was able to create a postage stamp in his honor.
- In 1963 President Kennedy awarded von Kármán the National Medal of Science: "Dr. von Karman, it is a great pleasure for me to select you as the first recipient of the National Medal of Science. I know of no one else who more completely represents all of the areas with which this award is appropriately concerned—science, engineering, and education."
- In 1957, von Kármán became the first recipient of the Ludwig-Prandtl-Ring from Deutsche Gesellschaft für Luft- und Raumfahrt (German Society for Aeronautics and Astronautics) for "outstanding contribution in the field of aerospace engineering."
- In 1956 von Kármán founded a research institute in Sint-Genesius-Rode, Belgium, which is now named after him: the von Karman Institute for Fluid Dynamics.
- In 1950, von Kármán received the ASME Thurston Lecture Award and delivered the first post-War ASME Thurston Lecture
- In 1948 von Kármán was awarded the Franklin Medal.
- The American Mathematical Society selected von Kármán as its Josiah Willard Gibbs Lecturer for 1939.
- The International von Kármán Wings Award Banquet is an annual affair.
- The only still airworthy Lisunov Li-2 plane (reg. HA-LIX) has been named Kármán Tódor in 2002.
- In 1983, He was inducted into the National Aviation Hall of Fame in Dayton, Ohio.

== See also ==
- The Martians (scientists)
- von Karman Institute for Fluid Dynamics
- Yoshimura buckling

== Explanatory notes ==
Academic offices
New institution	1st Director of the Jet Propulsion Laboratory; 1938 – 1944	Succeeded by Frank Malina
