= Nose cone design =

Geometry and construction of the foremost tip of airplanes, spacecraft and projectiles

General parameters used for constructing nose cone profiles.

In the aerodynamic design of any vehicle or body meant to travel through a compressible fluid medium (such as a rocket or aircraft, missile, shell or bullet), an important problem is the determination of the nose cone geometrical shape for optimum performance. For many applications, such a task requires the definition of a solid of revolution shape that experiences minimal resistance to rapid motion through such a fluid medium.

== Nose cone shapes and equations ==
=== General dimensions ===
In all of the following nose cone shape equations, L is the overall length of the nose cone and R is the radius of the base of the nose cone. y is the radius at any point x, as x varies from 0, at the tip of the nose cone, to L. The equations define the two-dimensional profile of the nose shape. The full body of revolution of the nose cone is formed by rotating the profile around the centerline C/L. While the equations describe the "perfect" shape, practical nose cones are often blunted or truncated for manufacturing, aerodynamic, or thermodynamic reasons.

=== Conic ===
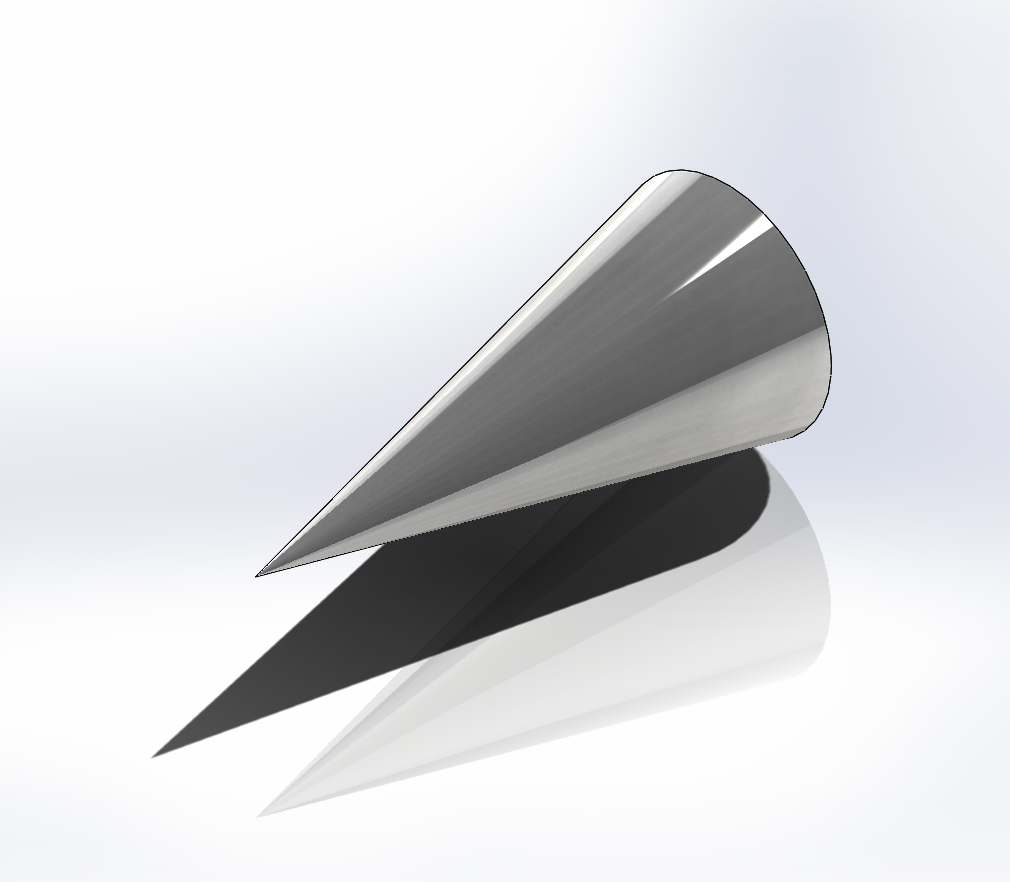
Conic nose cone render and profile with parameters shown.

$$\begin{align}
y &= \frac{xR}{L} = x \tan(\phi)\\
\phi &= \arctan \left(\frac{R}{L}\right) \\
\end{align}$$

==== Spherically blunted conic ====
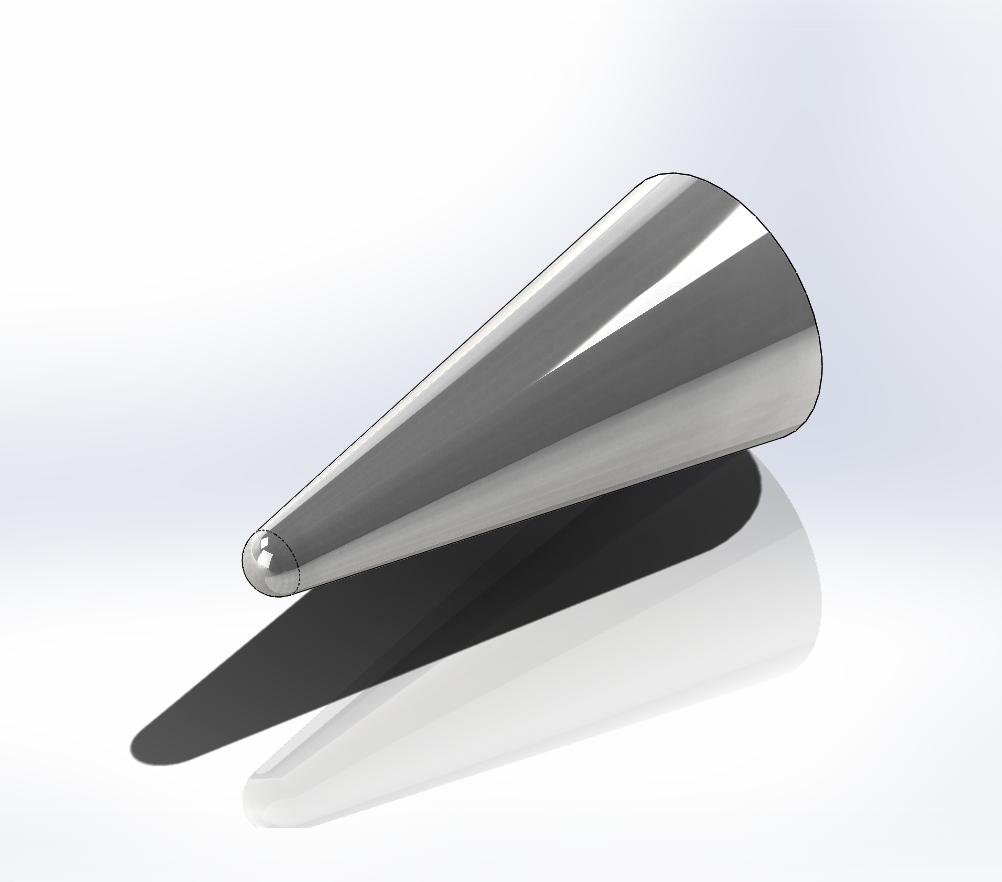
Spherically blunted conic nose cone render and profile with parameters shown.

$$\begin{align}
x_t & &&= \frac{r_nL^2}{R}\sqrt{ \frac{1}{R^2 + L^2}}\\
y_t &= \frac{x_t R}{L} &&= r_nL\sqrt{\frac{1}{R^2 + L^2}}\\
x_o &= x_t + \sqrt{r_n^2 - y_t^2} &&= r_n\left(\frac{L^2}{R}\sqrt{ \frac{1}{R^2 + L^2}} + \sqrt{1 - \frac{L^2}{R^2 + L^2}}\right)\\
x_a &= x_o - r_n &&= r_n\left(\frac{L^2}{R}\sqrt{ \frac{1}{R^2 + L^2}} + \sqrt{1 - \frac{L^2}{R^2 + L^2}} - 1\right)\\
\end{align}$$

=== Bi-conic ===
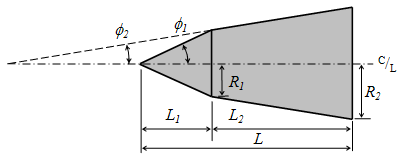
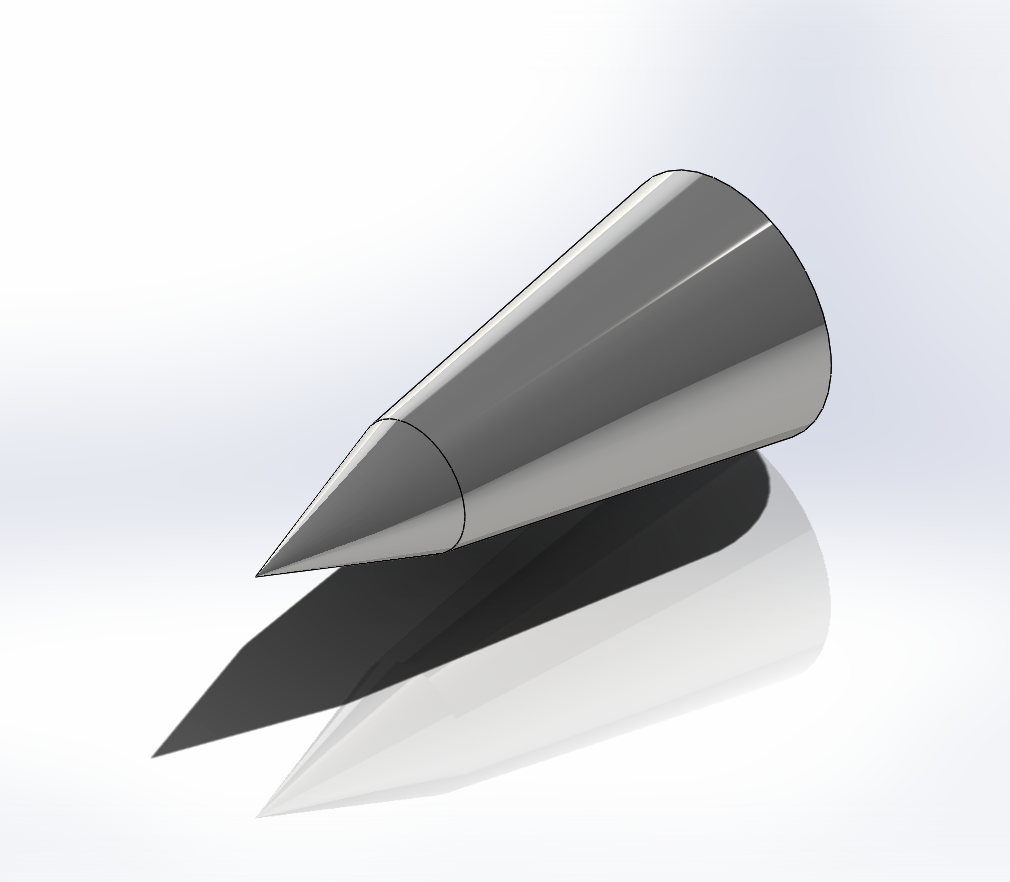
Bi-conic nose cone render and profile with parameters shown.

$$\begin{align}
L&=L_1+L_2\\
\phi_1 &= \arctan \left(\frac{R_1}{L_1}\right)\\
\phi_2 &= \arctan \left(\frac{R_2 - R_1}{L_2}\right)\\
y &=
\begin{cases}
\frac{xR_1}{L_1} = x \tan(\phi_1), &0 \le x \le L_1\\
R_1 + \frac{(x - L_1)(R_2-R_1)}{L_2} = R_1 + (x - L_1) \tan(\phi_2), &L_1 \le x \le L
\end{cases}
\end{align}$$

=== Tangent ogive ===
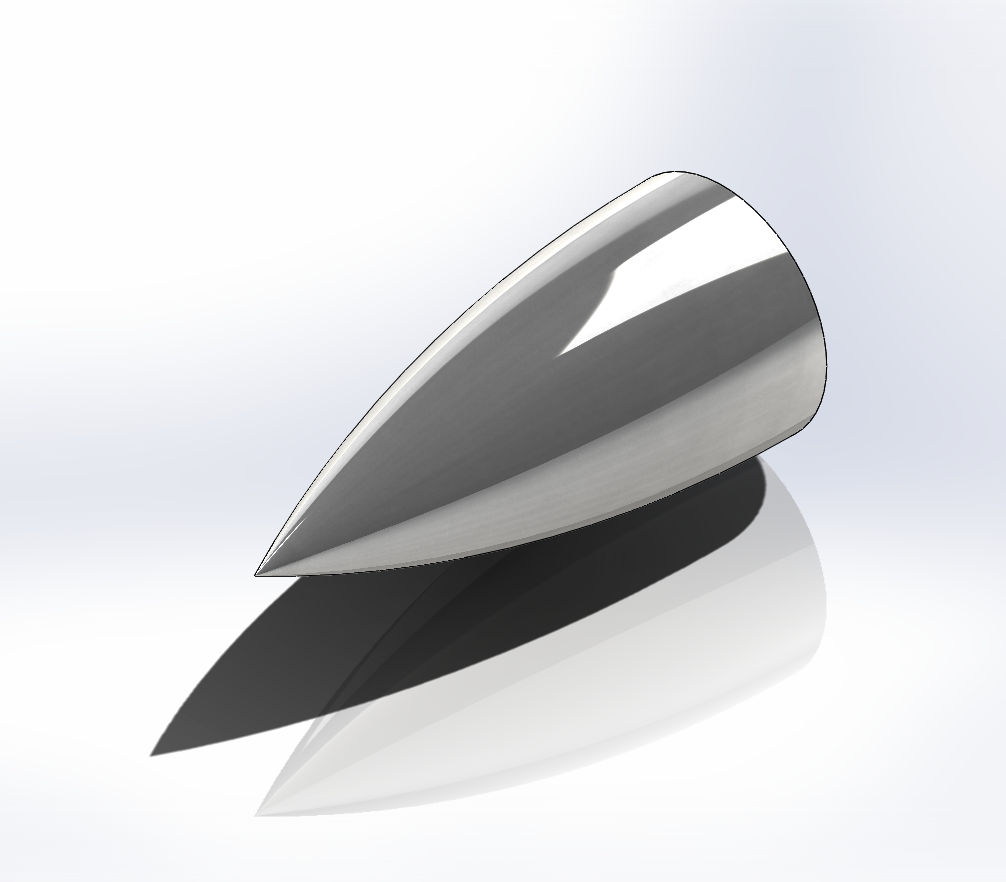
Tangent ogive nose cone render and profile with parameters and ogive circle shown.

$$\begin{align}
\rho &= \frac{R + \frac{L^2}{R}}{2}\\
y &= \sqrt{\rho^2 + x(2L - x)-L^2}+R- \rho\\
\end{align}$$

==== Spherically blunted tangent ogive ====
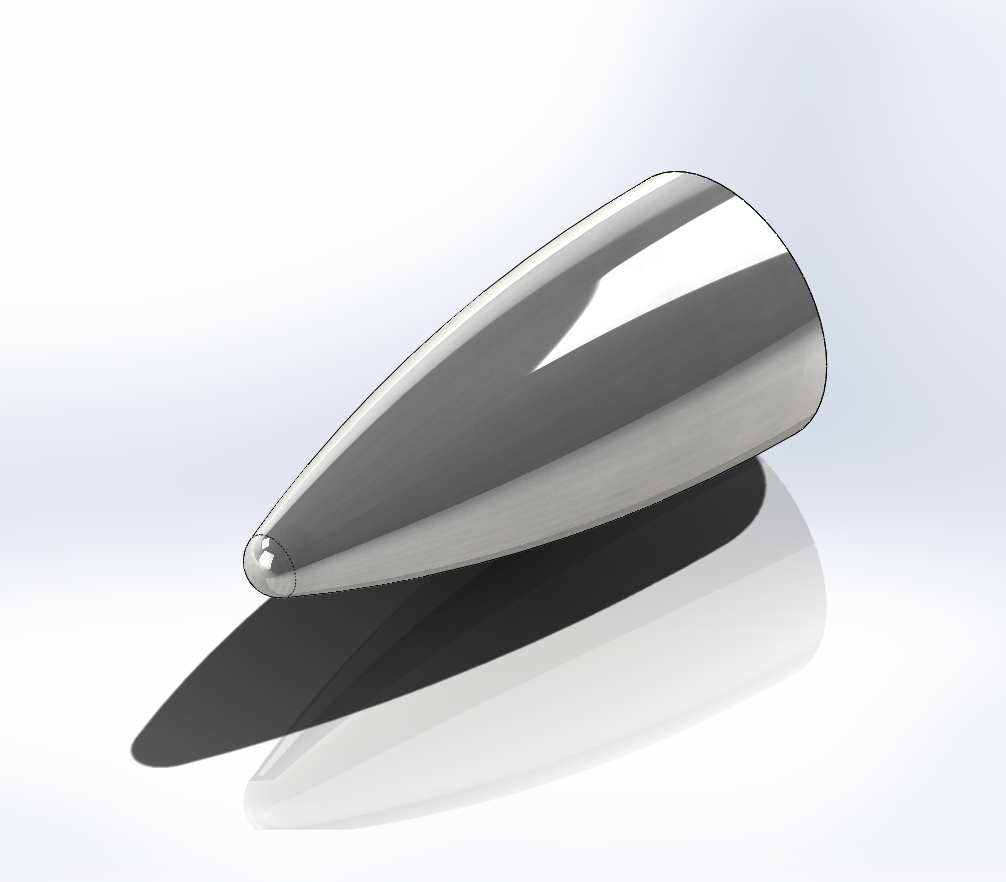
Spherically blunted tangent ogive nose cone render and profile with parameters shown.

$$\begin{align}
x_o &= L - \sqrt{\left(R - r_n\right)\left(\frac{L^2}{R} - r_n\right)}\\
y_t &= \frac{r_n\left(L^2-R^2\right)}{L^2 + R^2 - 2Rr_n} \\
x_t &= L - \sqrt{\left(R - r_n\right)\left(\frac{L^2}{R} - r_n\right)} - r_n\sqrt{1 - \left(\frac{L^2-R^2}{L^2 + R^2 - 2Rr_n}\right)^2} \\
\end{align}$$
Alternatively, if blunted length is specified in the design process, noted by $N$, theoretical un-blunted length can be determined using:
$$\begin{align}
L &= \sqrt{R \left(\frac{\left( N - r_n \right)^2}{R - r_n} + r_n \right)} \\
\end{align}$$
where $N = L - x_a$.

=== Secant ogive ===
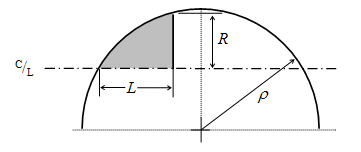
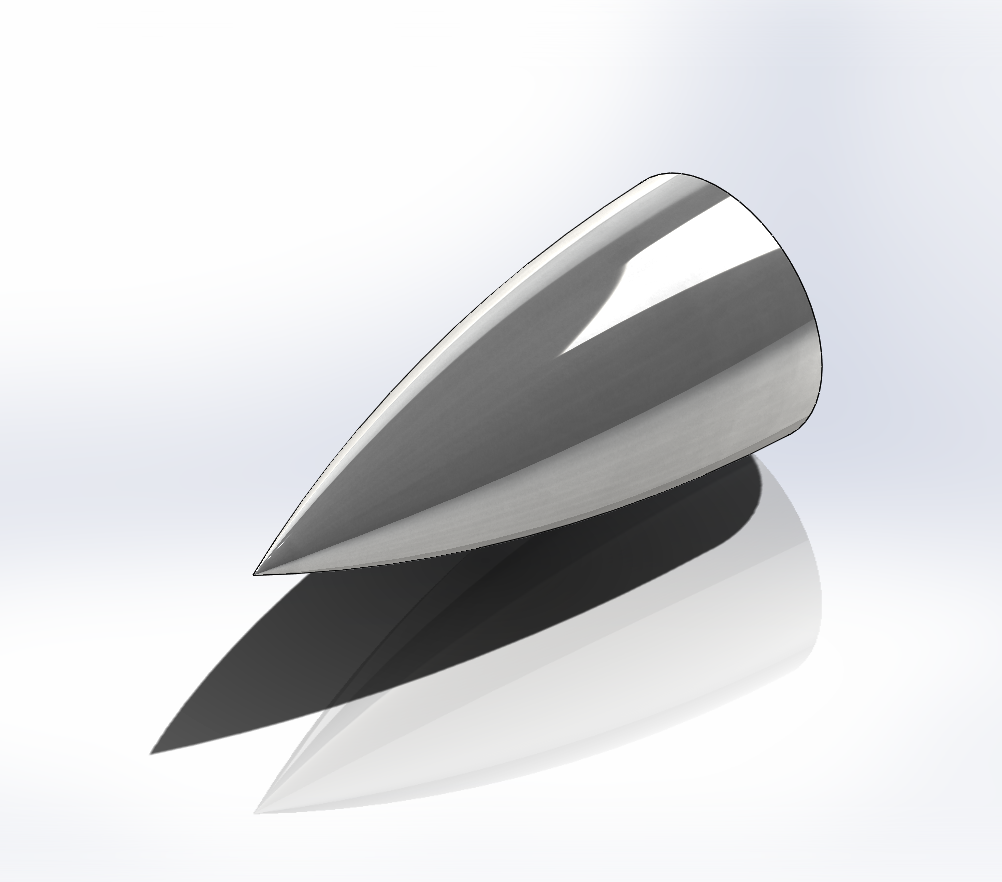
Secant ogive nose cone render and profile with parameters and ogive circle shown, ogive radius larger than for equivalent tangent ogive.

For a chosen ogive radius ρ greater than or equal to the ogive radius of a tangent ogive with the same R and L:

$$\begin{align}
\rho &\ge \frac{R + \frac{L^2}{R}}{2}\\
\alpha &= \arctan \left(\frac{R}{L}\right) - \arccos \left(\frac{\sqrt{R^2 + L^2}}{2\rho}\right)\\
y &= \sqrt{\rho^2 - (x-\rho\cos\alpha)^2} + \rho\sin(\alpha), && 0 \le x \le L\\
\end{align}$$

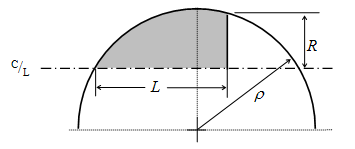
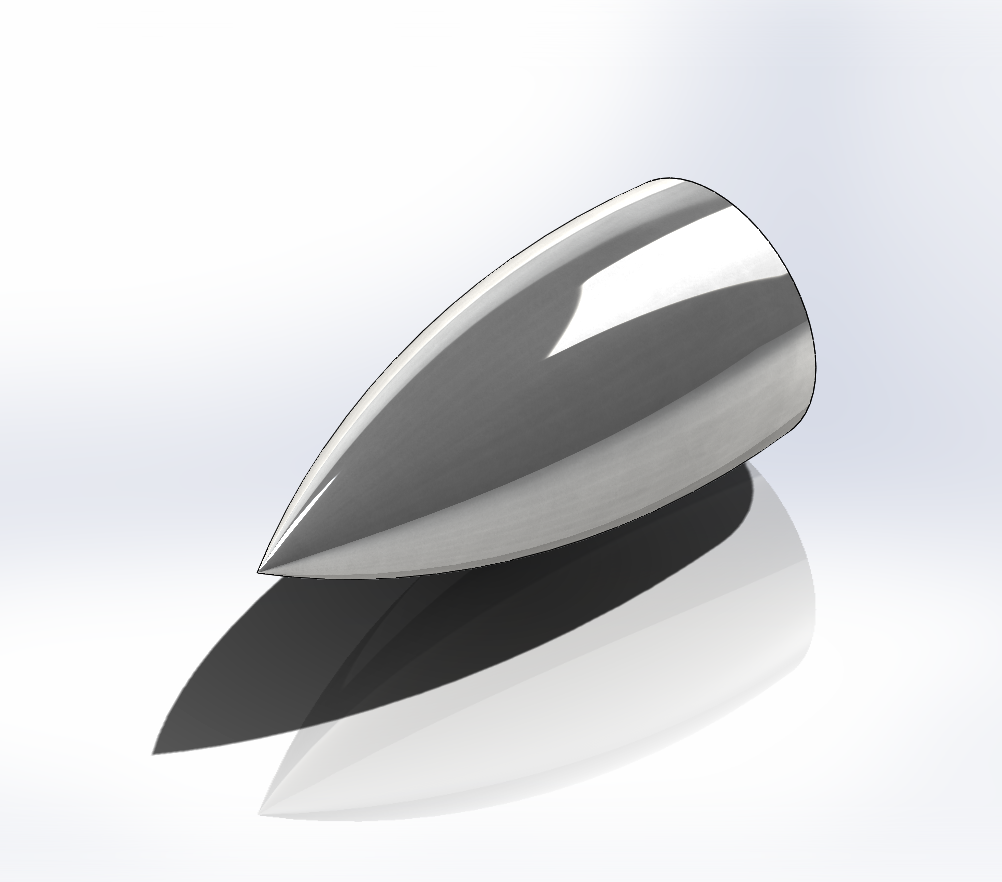
Alternate secant ogive render and profile which show a bulge due to a smaller radius.

A smaller ogive radius can be chosen; for $\frac{1}{2}\left(R + \frac{L^2}{R}\right) > \rho > \frac{L}{2}$, you will get the shape shown on the right, where the ogive has a "bulge" on top, i.e. it has more than one x that results in some values of y.

=== Elliptical ===
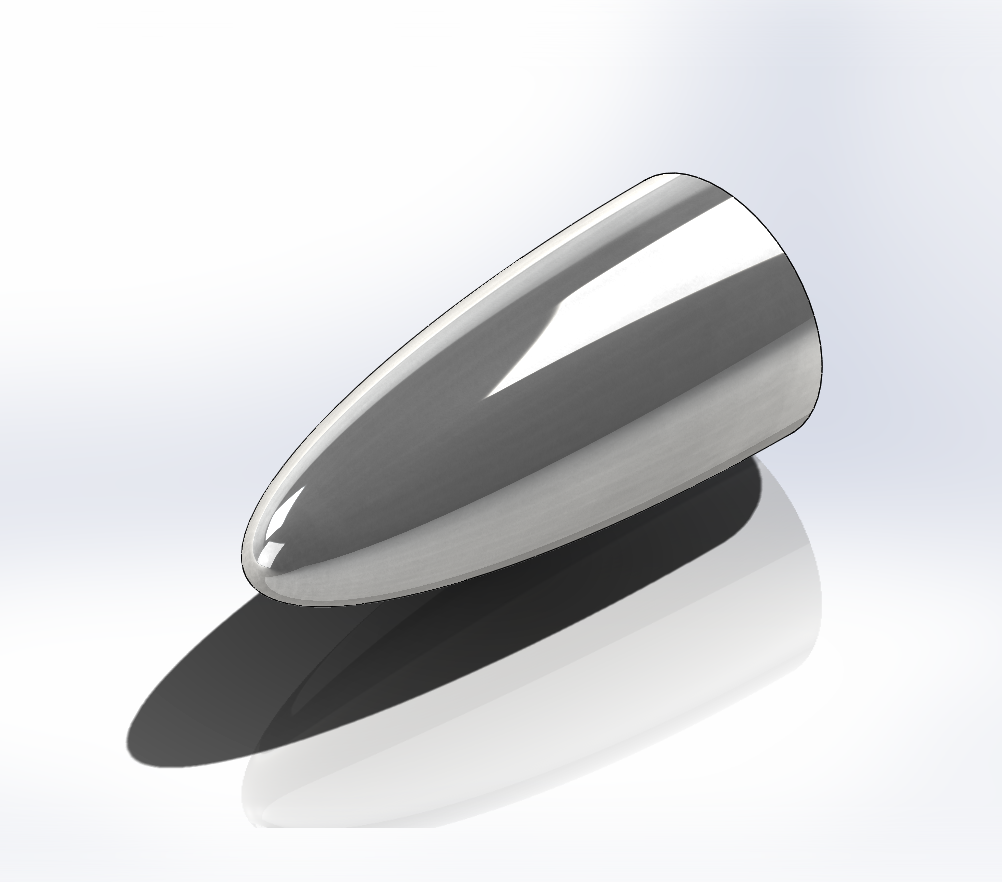
Elliptical nose cone render and profile with parameters shown.

$$y = \frac{R\sqrt{x(2L-x)}}{L}$$

=== Parabolic ===
A parabolic series nosecone is defined by $r = \tfrac{2x-Kx^2}{2-K}$ where $0\leq x\leq1$ and $K$ is a series-specific constant.

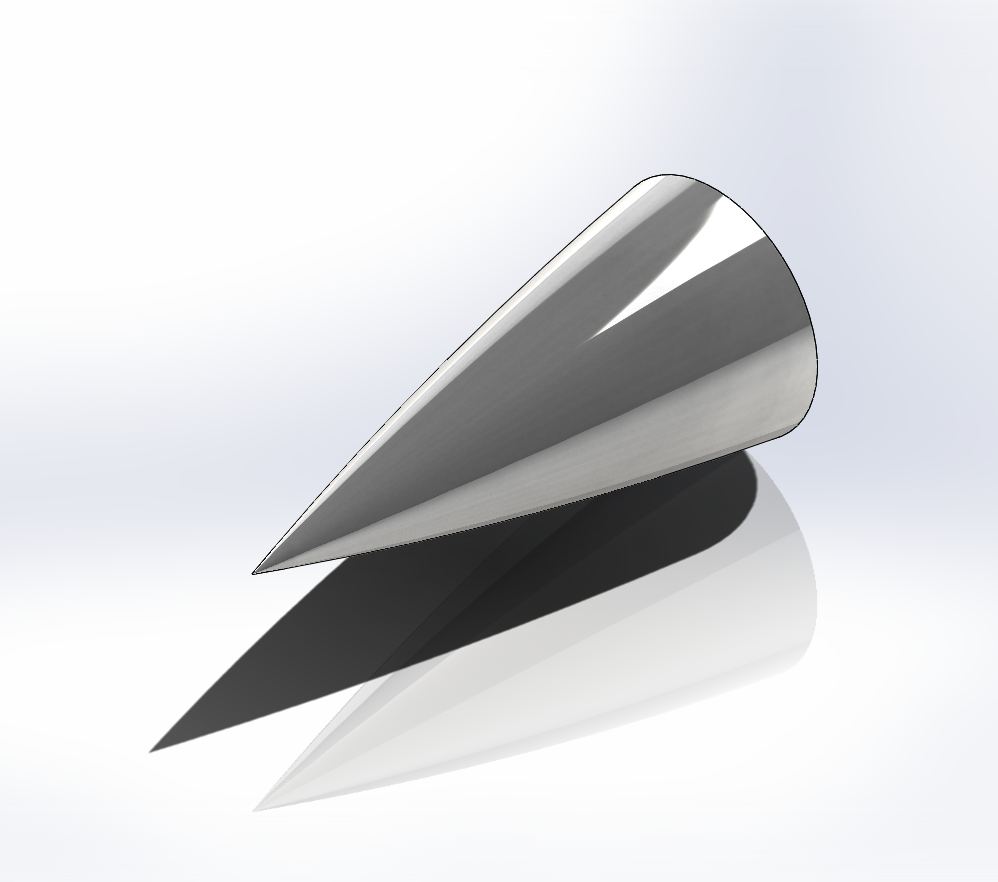
Half (K′ = 1/2)

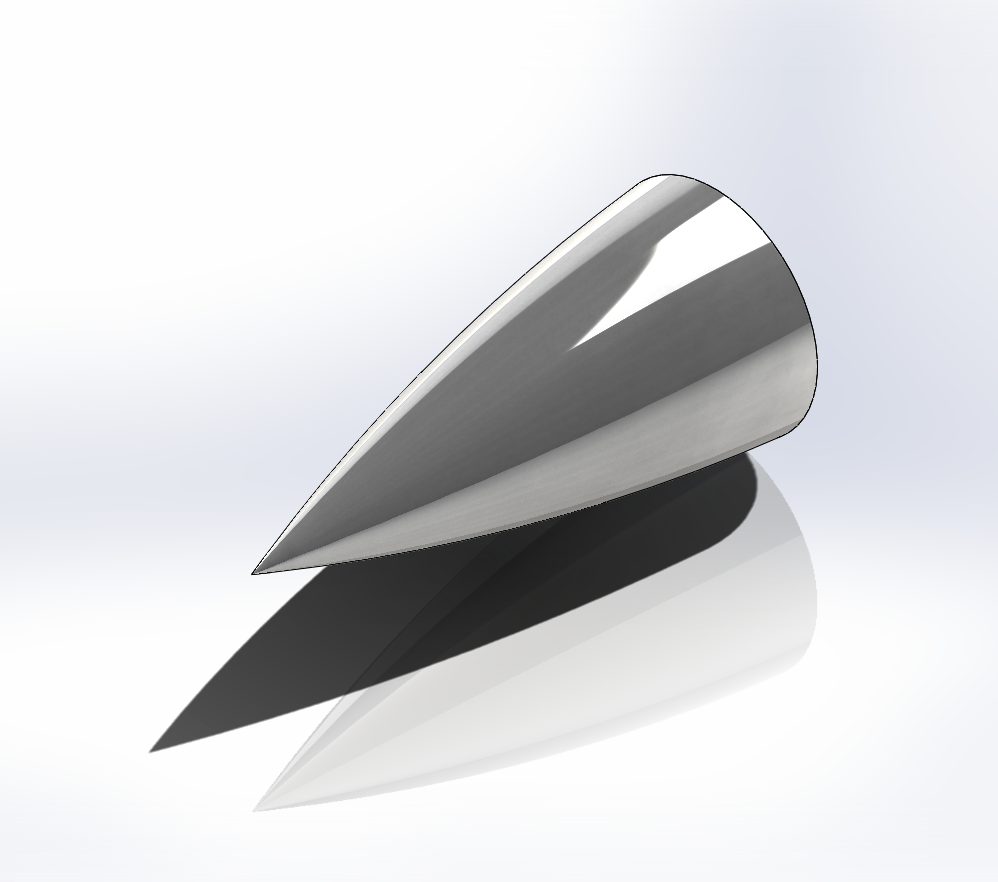
Three-quarter (K′ = 3/4)

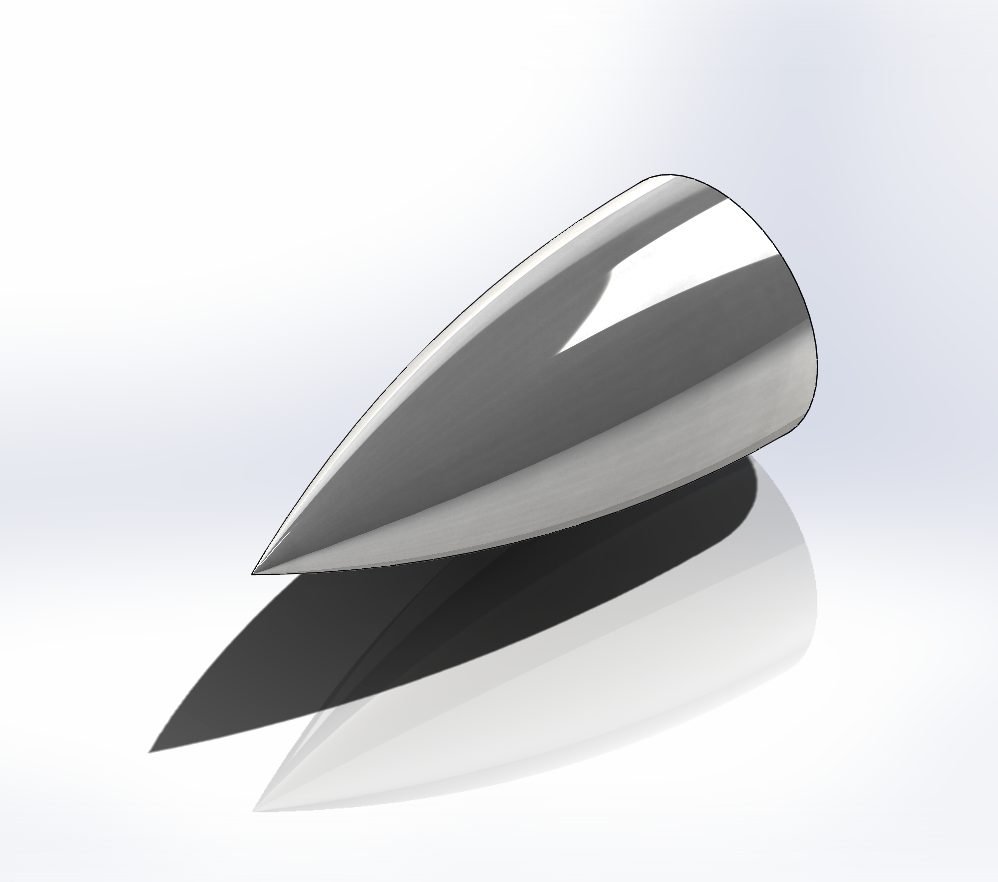
Full (K′ = 1)

Renders of common parabolic nose cone shapes.

For $0 \le K' \le 1$, $y = R\left({2 \left({x \over L}\right) - K'\left({x \over L}\right)^2 \over 2 - K'}\right)$

K′ can vary anywhere between 0 and 1, but the most common values used for nose cone shapes are:

| Parabola type | K′ value |
|---|---|
| Cone | 0 |
| Half | 1/2 |
| Three quarter | 3/4 |
| Full | 1 |

=== Power series ===
A power series nosecone is defined by $r = x^n$ where $(0\leq x\leq1)$. $n < 1$ will generate a concave geometry, while $n > 1$ will generate a convex (or "flared") shape.

Graphs illustrating power series nose cone shapes

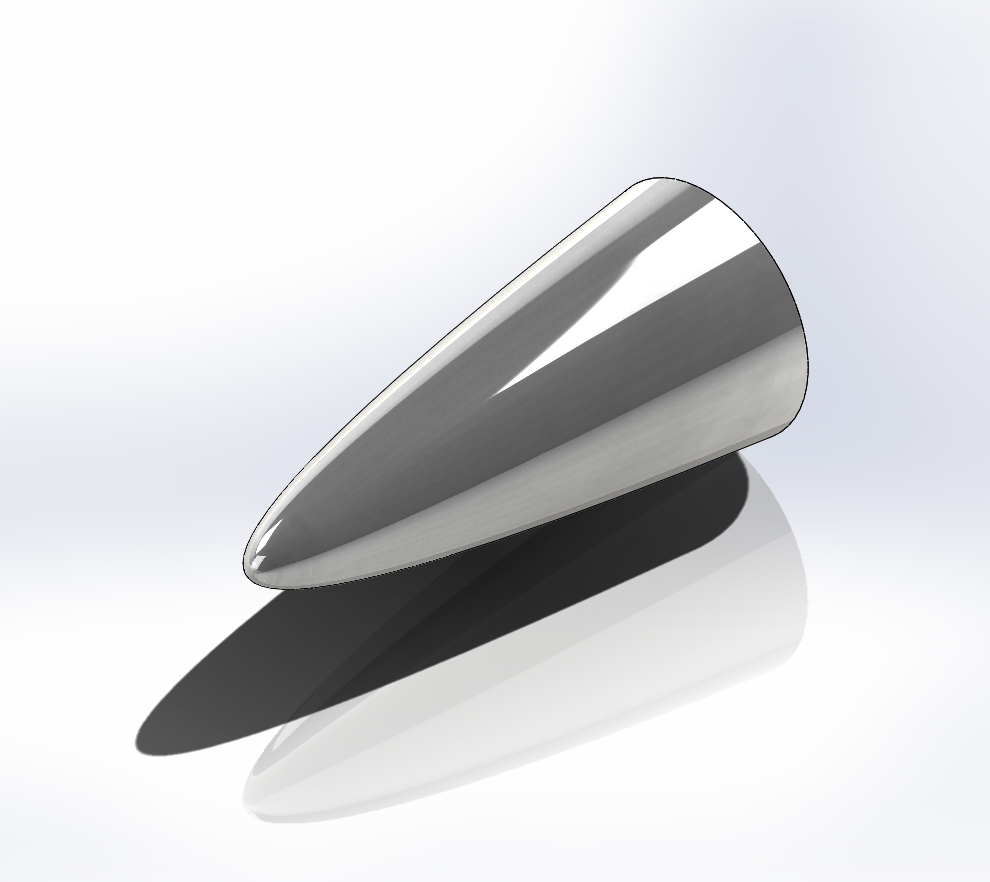
Half (n = 1/2)

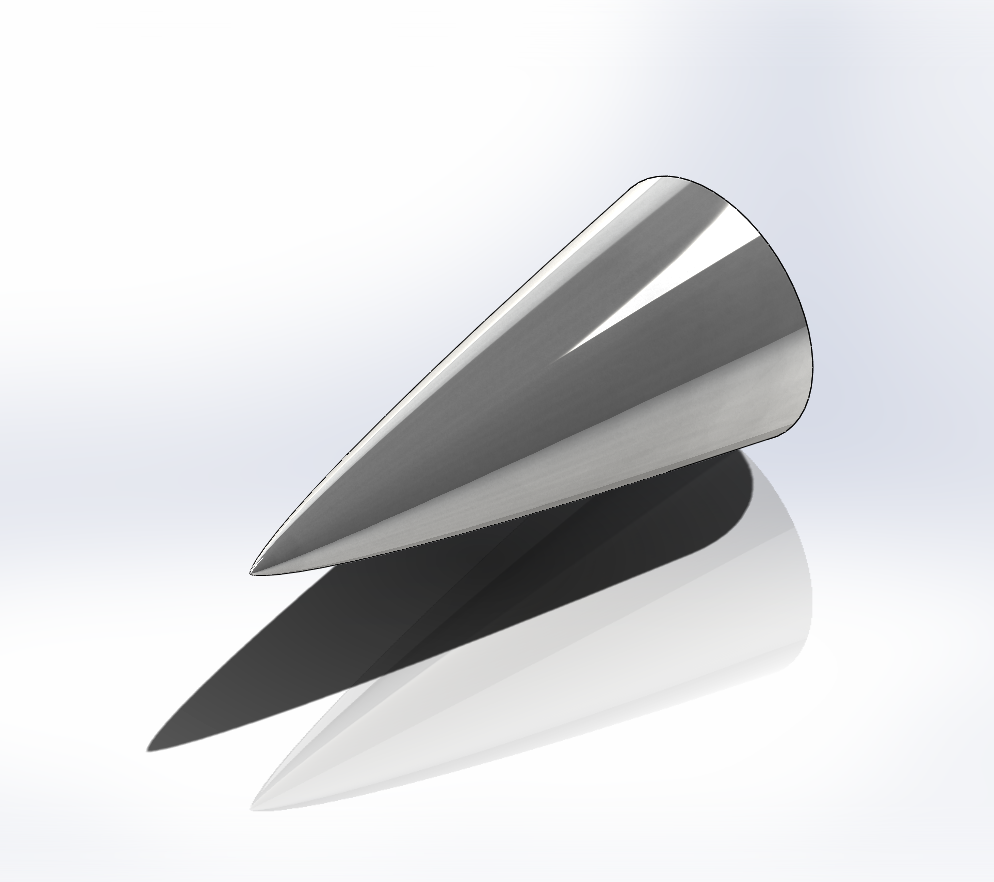
Three-quarter (n = 3/4)

For $0 \le n \le 1$: $y = R\left({x \over L}\right)^n$

Common values of n include:

| Power type | n value |
|---|---|
| Cylinder | 0 |
| Half (parabola) | 1/2 |
| Three quarter | 3/4 |
| Cone | 1 |

=== Haack series ===
Graphs illustrating Haack series nose cone shapes

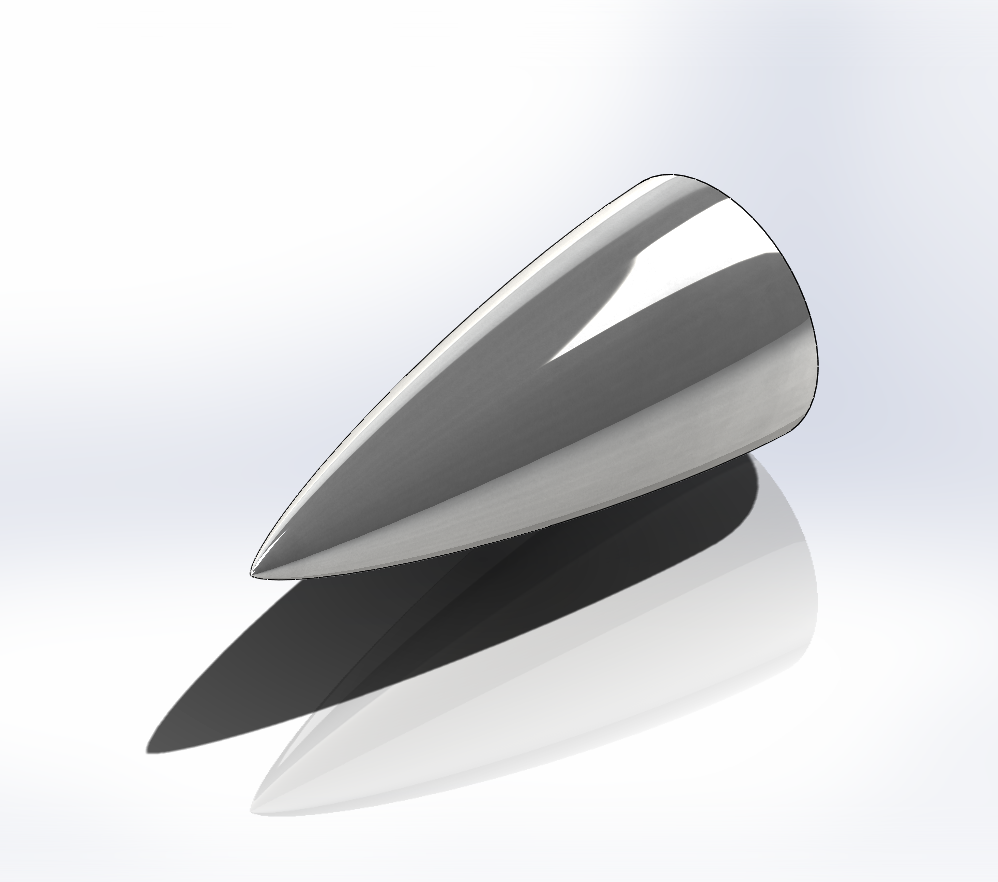
LD-Haack (Von Kármán) (C = 0)

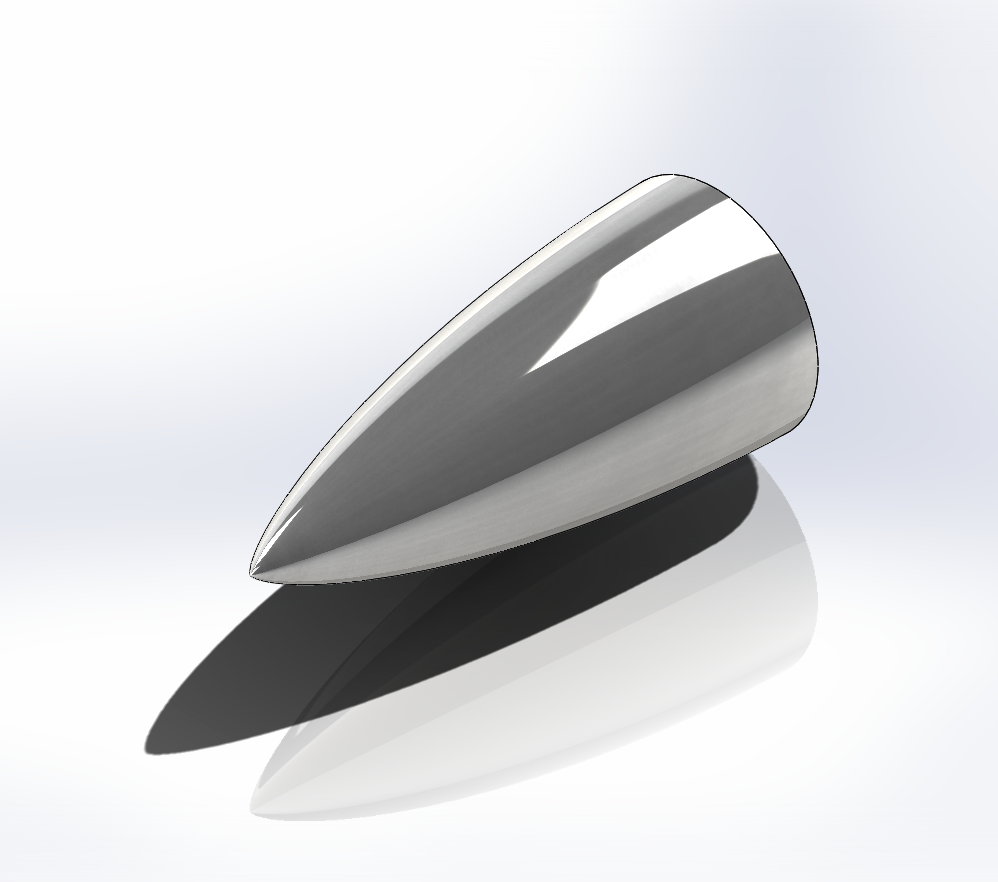
LV-Haack (C = 1/3)

A Haack series nosecone is defined by:
$$\begin{align}
r(\theta) &= \sqrt{\frac{\theta - \frac{1}{2}\sin(2\theta) + C \sin^{3}\theta}{\pi}}\\
\theta &= \arccos\!\left(1 - 2x\right)\\
0 &\leq x \leq 1 \Rightarrow 0 \leq \theta \leq \pi\\
\end{align}$$
where

- r is the radius divided by the maximum radius at a given θ or x,
- x is the distance from the nose divided by the total nose length.

Parametric formulation can be obtained by solving the θ formula for x (here, x is now distance from the nose, separated from the total nose length L, and y is the radius).
$$\begin{align}
x (\theta) &= {L \over 2} \left( 1 - \cos(\theta) \right) \\
y (\theta,C) &= {R \over \sqrt{\pi}} \sqrt{\theta - {\sin(2\theta)\over 2} + C \sin^3 (\theta)} \\
\end{align}$$

Special values of C (as described above) include:

| Haack series type | C value |
|---|---|
| LD-Haack (Von Kármán) | 0 |
| LV-Haack | 1/3 |
| Tangent | 2/3 |

==== Von Kármán ogive ====
The LD-Haack ogive is a special case of the Haack series with minimal drag for a given length and diameter, and is defined as a Haack series with C = 0, commonly called the Von Kármán or Von Kármán ogive. An ogive with minimal drag for a given length and volume can be called an LV-Haack series, defined by $C = \tfrac{1}{3}$. However, the LV-Haack series produces different values for radius as a function of x as opposed to the Sears-Haack body, which also attempts to provide a shape with minimal drag for a given length and volume. For example, the LV-Haack value for radius relative to maximum radius at x=0.5 is ≈ 0.7785, while a Sears-Haack body at the same point (halfway along the nose, which is 25% of the way along the body) has a radius relative to maximum radius of ≈ 0.8059.

=== Aerospike ===
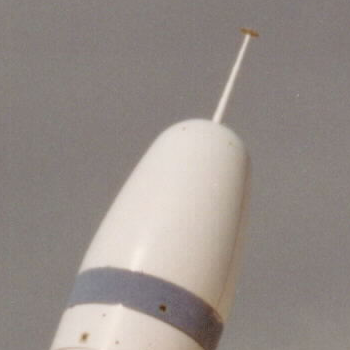
An aerospike on the UGM-96 Trident I

An aerospike can be used to reduce the forebody pressure acting on supersonic aircraft. The aerospike creates a detached shock ahead of the body, thus reducing the drag acting on the aircraft.

== Nose cone drag characteristics ==
=== Influence of the general shape ===
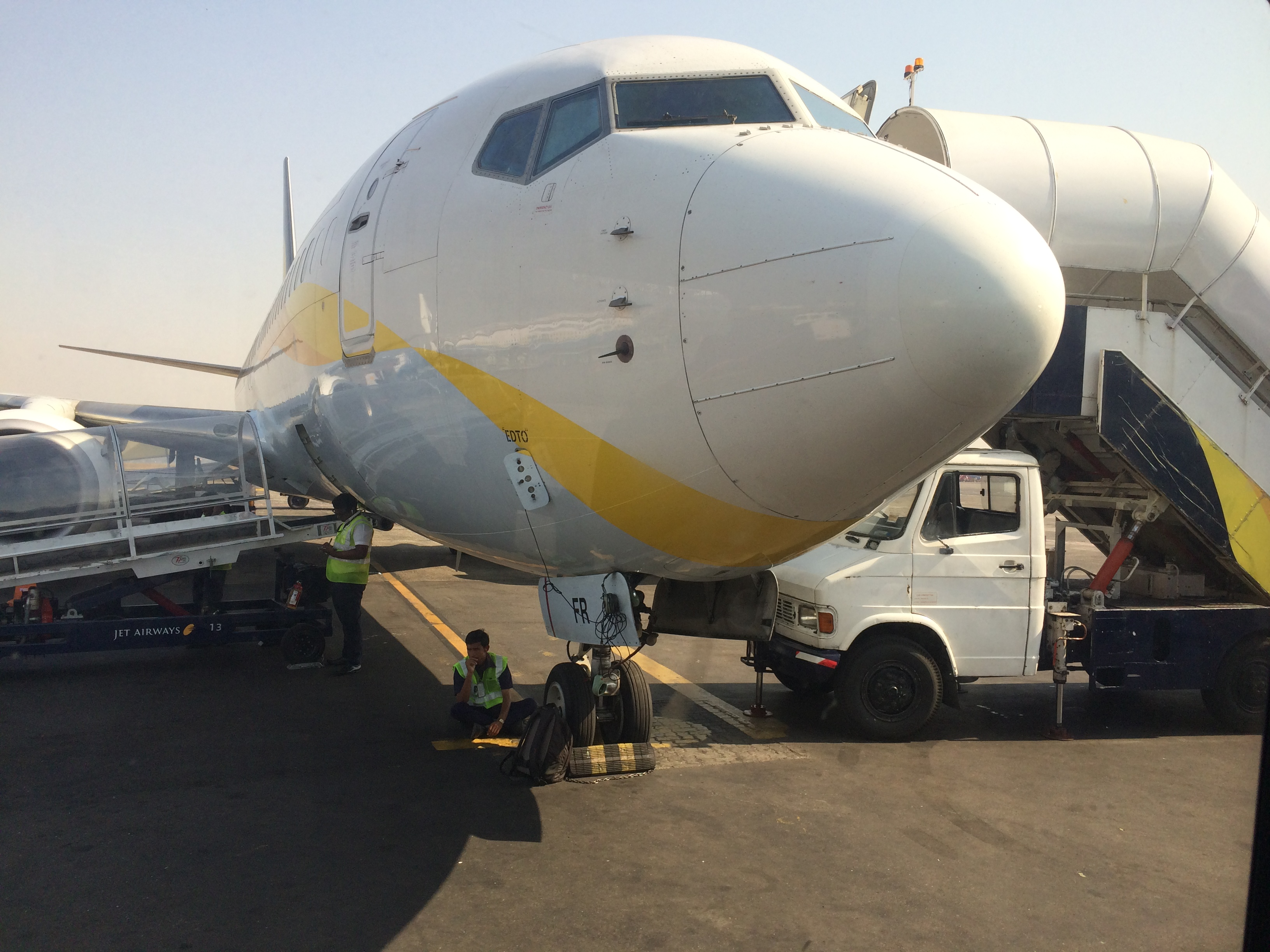
Closeup view of a nose cone on a Boeing 737

Comparison of drag characteristics of various nose cone shapes in the transonic to low-mach regions. Rankings are: superior (1), good (2), fair (3), inferior (4).

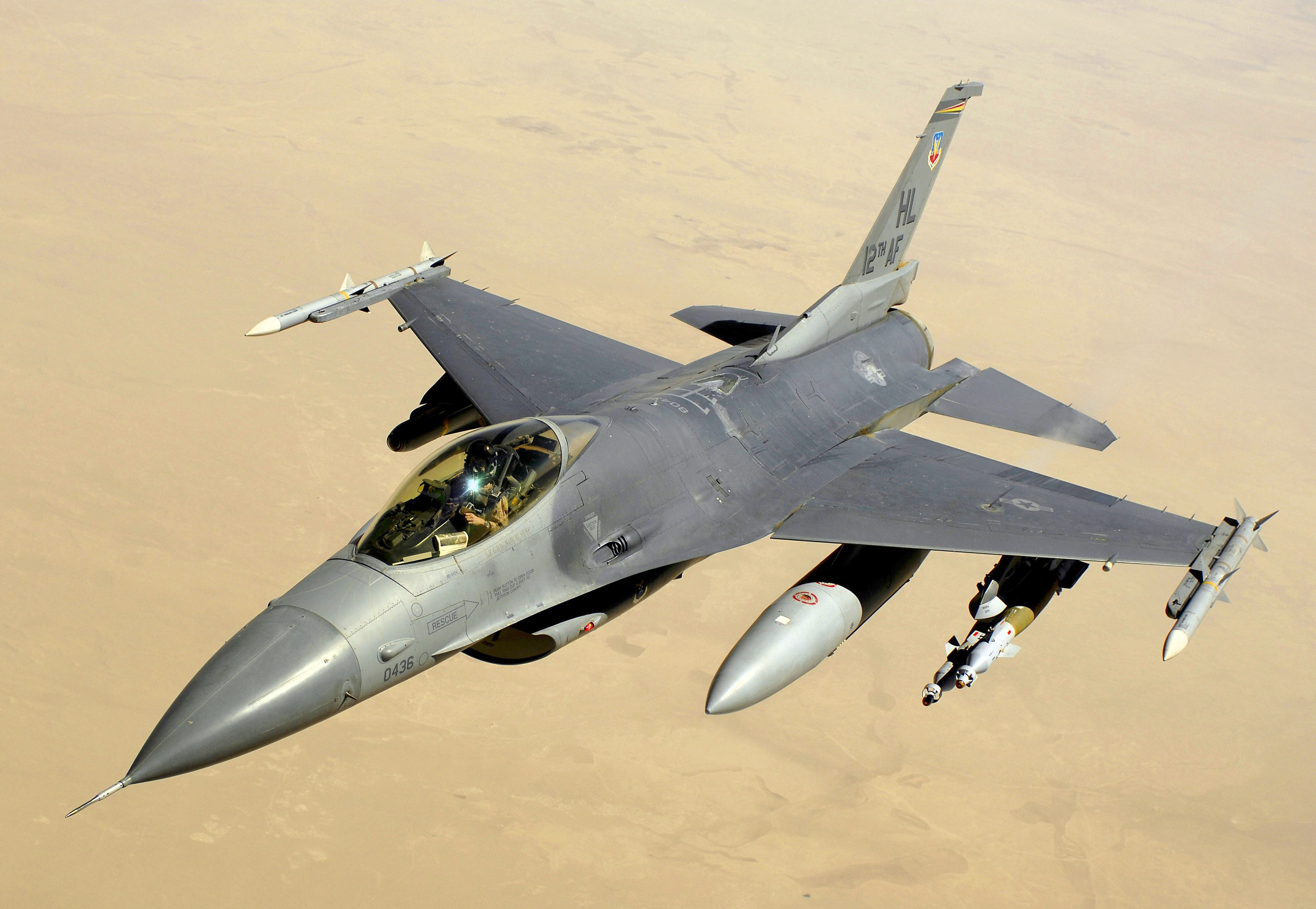
General Dynamics F-16 with a nose cone very close to the Von Kármán shape

== See also ==
- Index of aviation articles
- Bullet-nose curve
- Nose bullet
