= Rolf Heinrich Sabersky =

American professor of mechanical engineering

- Born: October 20, 1920; Berlin, Germany
- Died: October 24, 2016 (aged 96)
- Education: Franzosisches Gymnasium; Swiss Federal Technical Institute; California Institute of Technology
- Awards: American Society of Mechanical Engineers; Heat Transfer Memorial Award, 1977
- Scientific career
- Fields: Mechanical engineering
- Workplaces: Southern California Cooperative Wind Tunnel; Aerojet Engineering Corporation; California Institute of Technology
- Thesis: Experimental and theoretical investigations on the general flow patterns in axial flow compressors. (1949)
- Doctoral advisor: W. Duncan Rannie
- Other academic advisors: Carl David Anderson; H. Victor Neher; Charles Christian Lauritsen; Clark Millikan; Hans Wolfgang Liepmann
- Notable students: Carver Mead

Rolf Heinrich Sabersky (October 20, 1920 – October 24, 2016) was professor emeritus in mechanical engineering at Caltech. He worked with luminaries throughout his career including Apollo M. O. Smith and Theodore von Kármán at Aerojet. James Van Allan sought his expertise for the development of the Ajax and Bumblebee rocket programs.

== Life and Times ==
Rolf Heinrich Sabersky was born in Berlin, Germany. His parents were Fritz Sabersky, occupation listed as lawyer and Berta Sabersky, housewife with 3 children, son Wilhelm occupation listed as merchant, daughter Olga Leonore, student and Rolf, student.

1938, Sabersky graduated from the Franzosisches Gymnasium, the French High School. He attended from the age of 10 and completed the Abitur at the age of 17. A classmate of his was noted musicologist Alexander Ringer, professor of music at the University of Illinois. The children left Germany on July 3, 1938, and the parents soon followed. From Germany the family traveled to Zürich. While waiting for immigration visas to be issued, Sabersky passed the entrance exams and briefly attended the Swiss Federal Technical Institute or ETH Zurich. George Pólya was the proctor for the mathematics examination. The Sabersky family escaped Kristallnacht, which occurred in November 1938.

On December 17, 1938, the Sabersky family arrived at New York City, New York after sailing from Le Havre, France aboard the S.S. Normandie, according to records. The family recorded their race as Hebrew with spoken and written fluency in German and English. Mr. Sabersky and all the children were born in Berlin, Germany. Mrs. Sabersky was born in Sechof, Germany. The family had been issued immigration visas in Zürich on October 20, 1938. Before coming to America, the family resided at Berlin.

On April 11, 1940, according to the U.S. Census records, the Sabersky family resided at Los Angeles, California. Mr. Sabersky and son William were both listed as owner, operator of a soap factory.

== Education ==
In 1939, Sabersky entered California Institute of Technology (Caltech) as a sophomore in the mechanical engineering program. On December 7, 1941, the attack on Pearl Harbor by Japan occurred and brought the United States into World War II. Sabersky, a native German was forced to endure restrictions as the “enemy alien” status was applied. This meant no travel after nightfall and travel greater than 50 miles outside of his residence of record required prior approval and a special permit. As an undergraduate student while pursuing his studies at Caltech, Sabersky had noteworthy professors that included: Donald S. Clark, Frederic W. Hinrichs, Robert L. Daugherty, Robert T. Knapp, Franklin Thomas, William Hayward Pickering, Romeo R. Martel, William B. Munro, and James W. Daily. Sabersky was a member of Tau Beta Pi. In 1942, he received his B.S. degree in mechanical engineering. After his senior year at Caltech, Sabersky worked in mechanical design on the Southern California Cooperative Wind Tunnel under Mark Serrurier and Hap Richards. Major Arthur L. Klein, professor of aeronautics, was a consultant on the project. The work was located at the Guggenheim Aeronautical Laboratory, also known as GALCIT.

Graduate school was next. Sabersky continued his studies at Caltech. He took a vibrations course from Donald E. Hudson, professor of mechanical engineering and applied mechanics. Sabersky took a course in mathematics from Abe M. Zarem. Additional graduate professors included Donald S. Clark, Robert C. Bromfield and Peter Kyropoulos. In 1943, he received the M.S. degree in mechanical engineering.

In 1949, Sabersky was awarded a Ph.D. in mechanical engineering from California Institute of Technology. W. Duncan Rannie was his academic advisor for his work on axial flow compressors. His coursework involved classes from Carl David Anderson, professor of physics, H. Victor Neher, professor of physics; Charles Christian Lauritsen, Clark Millikan, and Hans Wolfgang Liepmann. His dissertation was titled: Experimental and theoretical investigations on the general flow patterns in axial flow compressors.

== Aerojet ==
In 1943, Sabersky completed the MS degree in mechanical engineering and went to work at Aerojet Engineering Corporation. On July 4, 1943, he received a telephone call from Apollo M. O. Smith and was offered a position at Aerojet. Smith was the chief engineer at Aerojet and an expert in fluid mechanics. Aerojet was founded by Theodore von Karman. Sabersky went to work under Martin Summerfield where the team was involved with the development of sustained duration liquid rocket engines. Sabersky was part of an engineering team with Chandler C. Ross and Marvin Stary, who were also Caltech graduates. The team worked on the development of what would become the Titan engine. Also from Caltech was Fritz Zwicky, professor of astronomy. During WW II, Aerojet also provided some support for early work by GALCIT on their Private and Corporal missiles. Some of these missiles were converted to sounding rocket service and WAC Corporal sounding rockets were launched in late 1945.

== Aerobee ==
In 1946, Sabersky made a trip to Washington, D.C. to establish contacts with the US Navy and other US government groups. He went to Johns Hopkins University and the Applied Physics Laboratory and was introduced to James Van Allen. The two decided to work together on the Aerobee project. James Van Allen, then supervisor of the High Altitude Research Group of the Applied Physics Laboratory (APL) at Johns Hopkins University, visited Sabersky at Aerojet in 1946 to survey their rocket capabilities, and this included the Ajax. As a result, Van Allen persuaded the US Navy to support development and initial production of what came to be known as the Aerobee family. Van Allen was also in charge of the sounding rocket part of the APL Bumblebee tactical solid rocket program, and from this coined the name Aerobee rocket as a contraction of the Aerojet and Bumblebee names. In late 1946, Sabersky returned to Caltech to pursue a Ph.D. He maintained his connection to Aerojet until 1970.

== California Institute of Technology ==
In 1949, he joined the Caltech faculty as a member of the Division of Engineering and Applied Science as assistant professor. Frederick C. Lindvall was the division chairman. The recently hired colleagues of Sabersky were: David Shotwell Wood, material science; Charles H. Wilts, electrical engineering; Robert B. Leighton, professor of physics; and Frank E. Marble. The well established colleagues of his were: Rannie, Hudson, Kyropoulos, Dino A. Morelli, professor of engineering design. Sabersky taught courses in thermodynamics, fluid mechanics, and heat transfer. One particularly noteworthy student that took his thermodynamics course was Carver Mead. In 1955, Sabersky was promoted to associate professor and became a full professor in 1961 and emeritus professor of mechanical engineering in 1988.

=== Research Interests ===
Sabersky was interested in research that focused on heat transfer. At Aerojet, he dealt with the challenge of how to cool rocket thrust chambers. When he returned to Caltech in 1946, he still had a keen interest in these problems. He decided to tackle the problem of boiling heat transfer. His first Ph.D. student, Max Edmund Ellion, was given the task as a dissertation project. Sabersky worked on liquids near the critical point. He teamed with Karl Knapp and Ed Hauptmann for this research effort. The problem of free convection in Bénard cells was investigated by Sabersky with Richard Carl Nielsen. Duane Floyd Dipprey worked on the issue of the effect of heat transfer to fluids flowing in rough surfaced tubes. Dipprey was able to build tubes with controlled roughness. Paul Maurice Debrule built upon the rough tubes research and continued with the application to polymer solutions. Eric Francois Matthys pursued an interest in non-Newtonian fluids and investigated the flow of a natural fluid, tomato juice. Sabersky explored the flow and heat transfer characteristics of the granular material. This project was funded in part by the National Science Foundation. William Noel Sullivan was tasked with this endeavor. Christopher E. Burns joined in the efforts to solve some of the mysteries of material granular flow. Another later project that Sabersky was involved with was the study of indoor air quality that involved smog and ozone. Frederick H. Shair assisted with these efforts. Gordon Peterson was the student that drove his automobile over the Los Angeles freeways to measure the ozone levels and record the data inside his vehicle.

== Awards and honors ==
- American Society of Mechanical Engineers, Heat Transfer Memorial Award, 1977

== Publications ==
- Bowen, John T., Sabersky, R. H., & Rannie, W. Duncan. (1949). Theoretical and Experimental Investigations of Axial Flow Compressors. Mechanical Engineering Laboratory CIT.
- Bowen, J. T., Sabersky, R. H., & Rannie, W. (1949). Theoretical and Experimental Investigations of Axial Flow Compressors, Pt. 2. Mech. Eng. Lab.
- Bowen, J. T., Sabersky, R. H., & Rannie, W. D. (1951). Investigations of Axial-Flow Compressors. Trans. Am. Soc. Mech. Engrs. 73.
- Sabersky, R. H. (1951). Gas Turbines. Engineering and Science. 15(1): 4.
- Sabersky, R. H. (1955). On the relationship between fluid friction and heat transfer in nucleate boiling. Journal of Jet Propulsion. 25(1): 9–12.
- Sabersky, R. H. (1955). On the start of nucleation in boiling heat transfer. Journal of Jet Propulsion. 25(2): 67–70.
- Sabersky, R. H. (1957). Elements of engineering thermodynamics. McGraw-Hill.
- Hastrup, R. C., Sabersky, R. H., Bartz, D. R., & Noel, M. B. (1958). Friction and heat transfer in a rough tube at varying Prandtl numbers. Jet Propulsion. 28(4): 259–263.
- Hustrup, R. C., Sabersky, R. H., Bartz, D. F., & Noel, M. B. (1958). Heat transfer in smooth and rough tubes. Jet Propulsion. 28(4): 259–263.
- Sabersky, R. H. (1959). Survey of problems in boiling heat transfer. High Speed Aerodynamics and Jet Propulsion. (Vol. 5, pp. 313–338). Princeton Univ. Press. Princeton, New Jersey.
- Sabersky, R. H. (1959). Recent developments in convective heat transfer. ARS Journal. 29(5): 325–331.
- Griffith, J. D., & Sabersky, R. H. (1960). Convection in a fluid at supercritical pressures. ARS Journal. 30(3): 289–291.
- Fuchs, N. A., Pratt, J. N., & Sabersky, R. H. (1960). Evaporation and Droplet Growth in Gaseous Media. Journal of Applied Mechanics. (27): 759.
- Dipprey, Duane F., & Sabersky, R. H. (1963). Heat and momentum transfer in smooth and rough tubes at various Prandtl numbers. International Journal of Heat and Mass Transfer. 6(5): 329–353.
- Githinji, P. M., & Sabersky, R. H. (1963). Some effects of the orientation of the heating surface in nucleate boiling. Journal of Heat Transfer. 85(4): 379-379.
- Sabersky, R. H., Acosta, A. J., & Hauptmann, E. G. (1964). Fluid Flow. Chapter 7.
- Sabersky, R. H., & Hauptmann, E.G., & Acosta, A. J. (1964). Fluid Flow: a First Course in Fluid Mechanics. Macmillan Publishing Company. New York.
- Townes, Harry W., & Sabersky, R. H. (1966). Experiments on the flow over a rough surface. International Journal of Heat and Mass Transfer. 9(8): 729–738.
- Knapp, Karl K., & Sabersky, R. H. (1966). Free convection heat transfer to carbon dioxide near the critical point. International Journal of Heat and Mass Transfer. 9(1): 41–51.
- Sabersky, R. H., & Hauptmann, Edward G. (1967). Forced convection heat transfer to carbon dioxide near the critical point. International Journal of Heat and Mass Transfer. 10(11): 1499–1508.
- Reiman, Thomas C., & Sabersky, R. H. (1968). Laminar flow over rectangular cavities. International Journal of Heat and Mass Transfer. 11(6): 1083–1085.
- Sabersky, R. H. (1968). Who Will Take the Lead in Engineering Education? Engineering and Science. 31(7): 8–10.
- Sabersky, R. H. (1969). Who Will Lead The Way in Engineering Education? Journal of Engineering Education.
- Sabersky, R. H. (1971). Heat transfer in the seventies. International Journal of Heat and Mass Transfer. 14(12): 1927–1949.
- Sabersky, R. H., Sinema, Daniel A., & Shair, Frederick H. (1973). Concentrations, decay rates, and removal of ozone and their relation to establishing clean indoor air. Environmental Science & Technology. 7(4): 347–353.
- Nielsen, R. C., & Sabersky, R. H. (1973). Transient heat transfer in Bénard convection. International Journal of Heat and Mass Transfer. 16(12): 2407–2420.
- Debrule, Paul M., & Sabersky, R. H. (1974). Heat transfer and friction coefficients in smooth and rough tubes with dilute polymer solutions. International Journal of Heat and Mass Transfer. 17(5): 529–540.
- Derham, R. L., Peterson, G., Sabersky, R. H., & Shair, F. H. (1974). On the relation between the indoor and outdoor concentrations of nitrogen oxides. Journal of the Air Pollution Control Association. 24(2): 158–161.
- Taylor, Dean D., & Sabersky, R. H. (1974). Extrapolation to various tube diameters of experimental data taken with dilute polymer solutions in a smooth tube. Letters in Heat and Mass Transfer. 1(1): 103–108.
- Sullivan, William Noel, & Sabersky, R. H. (1975). Heat transfer to flowing granular media. International Journal of Heat and Mass Transfer. 18(1): 97–107.
- Petersen, G. A., & Sabersky, R. H. (1975). Measurements of pollutants inside an automobile. Journal of the Air Pollution Control Association. 25(10): 1028–1032.
- Sabersky, R. H. (1975). Further comments on heat transfer research. International Journal of Heat and Mass Transfer. 18(11): 1223–1227.
- Moyls, A. Leigh, & Sabersky, R. H. (1975). Heat transfer to dilute asbestos dispersions in smooth and rough tubes. Letters in Heat and Mass Transfer. 2(4): 293–302.
