= Jack James (rocket engineer) =

American rocket engineer (1920–2001)

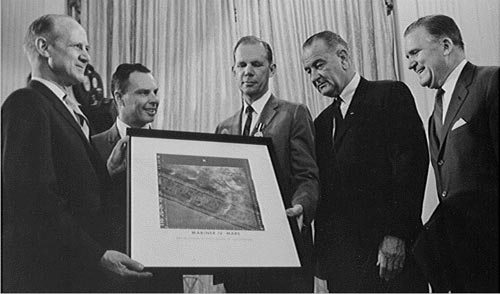
Jack N. James (center), JPL's Mariner 4 Project Manager, with a group in the White House presenting the spacecraft's famous picture Number 11 of Mars to US President Lyndon B. Johnson (center right) in July 1965.

Jack Norval James (November 22, 1920 – August 7, 2001) was a US rocket engineer who worked for over 35 years at the Jet Propulsion Laboratory, Pasadena, California, USA. His work as a Project Manager for NASA's Mariner program in the 1960s included the first planetary flyby (of Venus) and first photographs by a space probe of Mars. He received commendations for his work from several US Presidents, and his awards include the NASA Exceptional Scientific Achievement Medal (1965) and the Stuart Ballantine Medal (1967).

== Early life ==
Jack Norval James was born on November 22, 1920, in Dallas, Texas, growing up in Oak Cliff, Dallas, where he graduated from Sunset High School in 1937. He studied at the Southern Methodist University, graduating in electrical engineering in 1942. Following apprentice work at the General Electric Company, and service as a naval radar maintenance officer in World War II, he studied for a master's in electrical engineering (1949) at Union College, Schenectady, New York. During this postwar period he also worked at the Malta Test Station, and made trips to the testing grounds at the White Sands Missile Range, New Mexico. He briefly worked for RCA, before transferring in 1950 to the Jet Propulsion Laboratory (JPL) in Pasadena, California, where he worked for the next 36 years.

== JPL career ==
During his early years at the JPL, James worked on the MGM-5 Corporal and MGM-29 Sergeant guided missiles. As the work at the JPL changed from military rockets to spacecraft, he worked on the Pioneer 4 lunar probe and other missions. In 1961, he was named Project Manager of the Mariner Venus Project that led to the success of Mariner 2 which carried out the first ever planetary flyby, passing Venus on December 14, 1962. James was also Project Manager for the Mariner Mars Project that led to Mariner 4's successful flyby of Mars on July 14, 1965. These were the first successful planetary encounters, and the first missions to return data from Venus and Mars.

For his work on the Mariner program, James was presented with a public service award from NASA, and received awards from Presidents John F. Kennedy and Lyndon B. Johnson. His awards include the NASA Exceptional Scientific Achievement Medal (1965). The citation for this award stated that it was:

For outstanding accomplishment in the design, development and flight operation of Mariner II and Mariner IV.

James and his JPL colleague Robert J. Parks were presented with the Stuart Ballantine Medal (Engineering) from the Franklin Institute in 1967 for their: "Application of electromagnetic communication to the first successful reconnaissance of Mars by the Mariner IV". He was elected a fellow of the Institute of Electrical and Electronics Engineers, and was a member of the American Institute of Aeronautics and Astronautics. In 1974, James was honoured with the Distinguished Alumni Award from his alma mater, the Southern Methodist University. By the time of his retirement on January 1, 1987, James had held several positions as an assistant laboratory director (ALD) at the JPL, including leading its technical divisions from 1967 to 1972.

== Later life ==
James died aged 80 on August 7, 2001, in Pasadena. He had been living in La Cañada, and was survived by his wife, four children and two grandchildren. His autobiographical account of his life and the history of the space programs he worked on, In High Regard, was privately published posthumously in 2006. In 2011, James was included in the Southern Methodist University's list of History Makers as part of their centennial celebrations.
