= Robert J. Parks =

American aerospace engineer

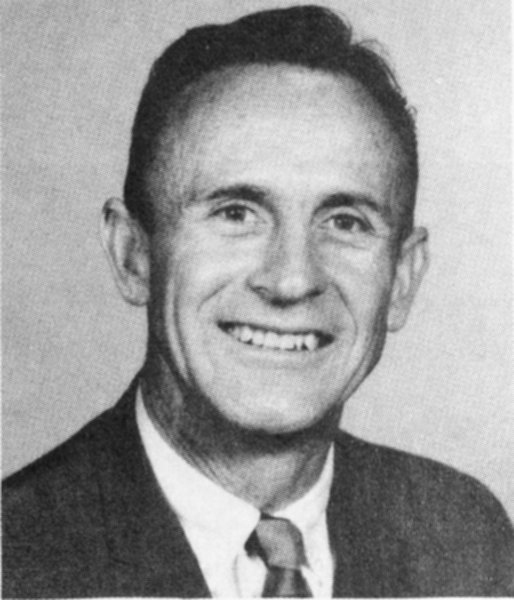
- Parks c. 1980
- Born: April 1, 1922; Los Angeles, California, US
- Died: June 3, 2011 (aged 89)
- Education: Caltech
- Scientific career
- Workplaces: JPL

Robert J. "Bob" Parks (April 1, 1922 – June 3, 2011) was an American aerospace engineer and pioneer in the space program who was involved into multiple NASA space missions. Parks worked for more than 40 years at the Jet Propulsion Laboratory (NASA/Caltech), located in Pasadena, California. He served as Guidance Engineer for Explorer 1, the first successfully launched US. He directed the initial flyby missions to the Moon (Ranger 7, 8 and 9 missions), the first soft landing on the Moon (Surveyor Lunar Lander), Earth's first successful mission to another planet (Mariner 2 to Venus) and initial missions to Mars, Saturn, Jupiter and Uranus.

Parks concluded his career as Deputy Director of the JPL and retired in 1987. Some of the awards he received for his work include the NASA Exceptional Service Medal (1967), the Stuart Ballantine Medal (1967), the Goddard Astronautics Award (1980) and the Caltech Distinguished Alumni Award in 1982.

== Early life ==
Robert Joseph Parks was born on 1 April 1922 in Los Angeles, California and grew up in Glendale and Balboa Island. His father was petroleum engineer Joseph Burton Parks, his mother was Ruth (Feltz) Parks, and his brother was Jerome W. Parks. He attended California Institute of Technology (Caltech), where he played in the backfield on the freshman football team (including one game in the Rose Bowl, Caltech's home field) and was elected to Tau Beta Pi, the honorary engineering fraternity. He graduated with honors in 1944, with a BS degree in electrical engineering.

From February 1944 to June 1946 he served with the US Army Signal Corps, including a tour in occupied Europe. During his service, he received considerable additional schooling in electronics and radar at Harvard, the Massachusetts Institute of Technology, and the Army's Fort Monmouth. He was discharged from the Army as a first lieutenant. While stationed in Austria, he met his future wife Hanne Richter, an interpreter and the daughter of a professor at the Vienna Conservatory of Music. She and Parks would later have three sons. After leaving the army, Parks spent six months at Hughes Aircraft before starting work at the Jet Propulsion Laboratory (JPL) in April 1947.

== JPL career ==
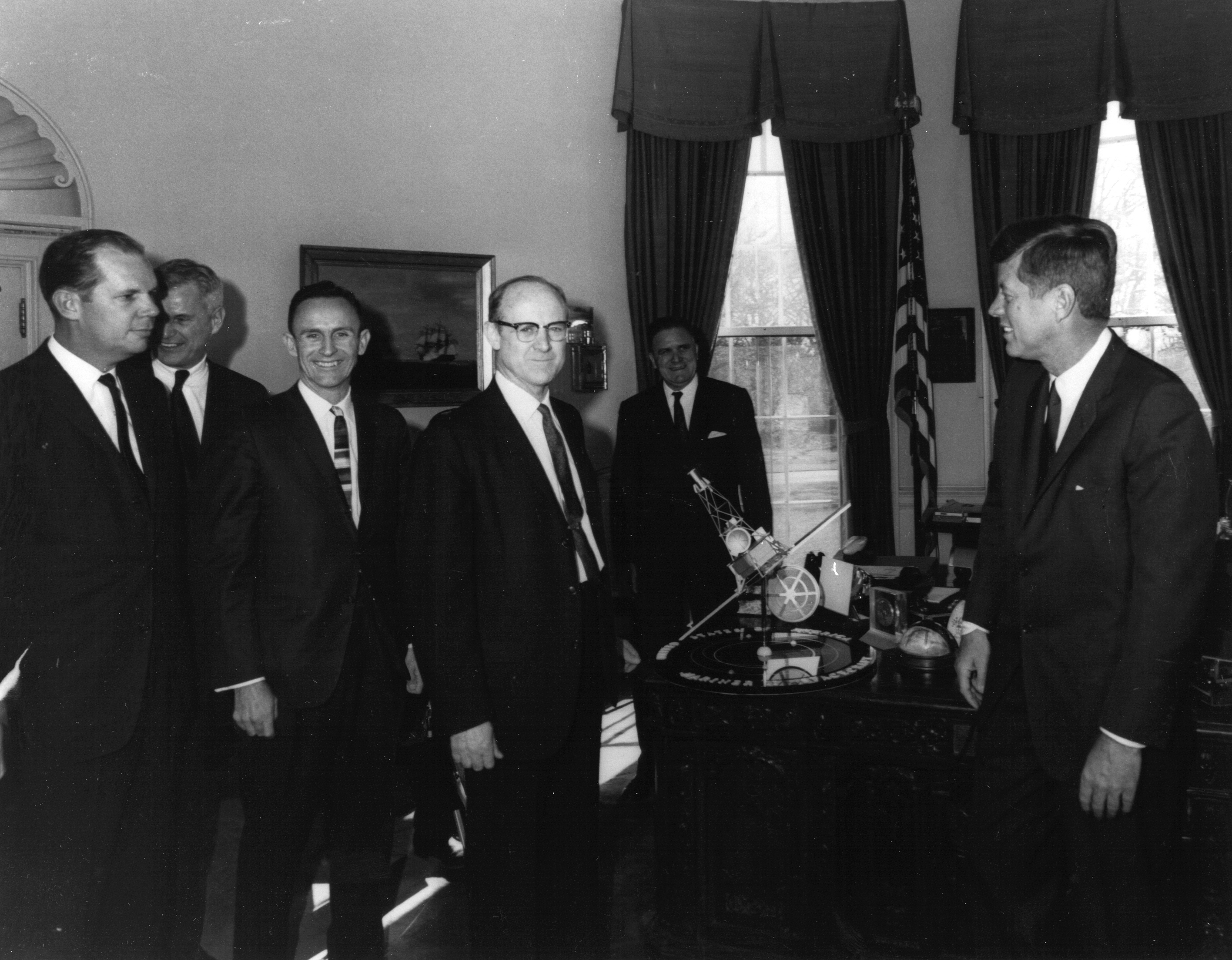
NASA and Mariner program officials, engineers and managers at the White House with President John F. Kennedy (right) in 1963. From left to right: Jack N. James, Bob Parks and William H. Pickering.

During his early years at the JPL, Parks started out as an engineer in the Guidance and Control Section from 1947 to 1950 where he worked with Wernher von Braun in White Sands, New Mexico to develop the guidance systems for the Army's MGM-5 Corporal and MGM-29 Sergeant guided missiles. He then became Section Chief, and from 1956 to 1957 was Division Chief of Research and Development. He was Project Director for the Sergeant missile program from 1957 until June 1960 when the work at JPL was turning from missiles to spacecraft.

Starting in May 1960, under Parks' direction, NASA/JPL conducted the world's first spacecraft mission to another planet, the Mariner 2 mission to Venus in 1962; the Ranger 7, 8 and 9 missions in 1964 and 1965, which produced the first close-up photos of the Moon; and the Mariner 4 mission to Mars in 1965. He was also a project manager for the Surveyor lunar lander series, the first soft landing on the Moon, the precursor to the Apollo Manned Program in 1965 and 1966.

Parks also oversaw Mariner 5 to Venus in 1967; Mariners 6 and 7 to Mars in 1969; Mariner 9 to Mars in 1971; Mariner 10, which in 1973 was the first spacecraft to travel to the planet Mercury; and the JPL portion of NASA's Viking orbiter and lander mission to Mars. In 1978 and 1979, Parks managed the Voyager program which sent spacecraft to Jupiter, Saturn, Uranus and Neptune, which now has left the Solar System and continues to this day.

Parks served in various roles at JPL including Director of the Planetary Programs during the early 1960s Assistant Laboratory Director (ALD) for Lunar and Planetary Projects in 1963. He held this role through various name changes until 1981 when he became JPL deputy director. In this position he was responsible for the day-to-day management of JPL and for the direction of its technical, administrative, and service activities until his retirement in 1987.

Upon his death on June 3, 2011, Bob was recognized by JPL which compiled a documentary film about his career entitled a Tribute to a Space Explorer.

== Awards and later life ==
Parks received numerous awards for his distinguished service at JPL, including the NASA Distinguished Public Service Medal (1963) and the NASA Exceptional Service Medal (1967). The American Institute of Aeronautics and Astronautics awarded him its Louis W. Hill Award (1963) and Goddard Astronautics Award (1980). He and his JPL colleague Jack N. James were presented with the Stuart Ballantine Medal (Engineering) from the Franklin Institute in 1967 for "Application of electromagnetic communication to the first successful reconnaissance of Mars by the Mariner IV". In 1973, Parks was elected to the National Academy of Engineering for "Contributions in radio-inertial guidance, communications methods, systems engineering, and project management of spacecraft and missiles." He was awarded the Caltech Distinguished Alumni Award in 1982.

At the time of his retirement from JPL in 1987, Parks was living with his wife Hanne in nearby Balboa Island, California. He was survived by his three sons. Parks died on 3 June 2011, at 89.
