= Corporal E =

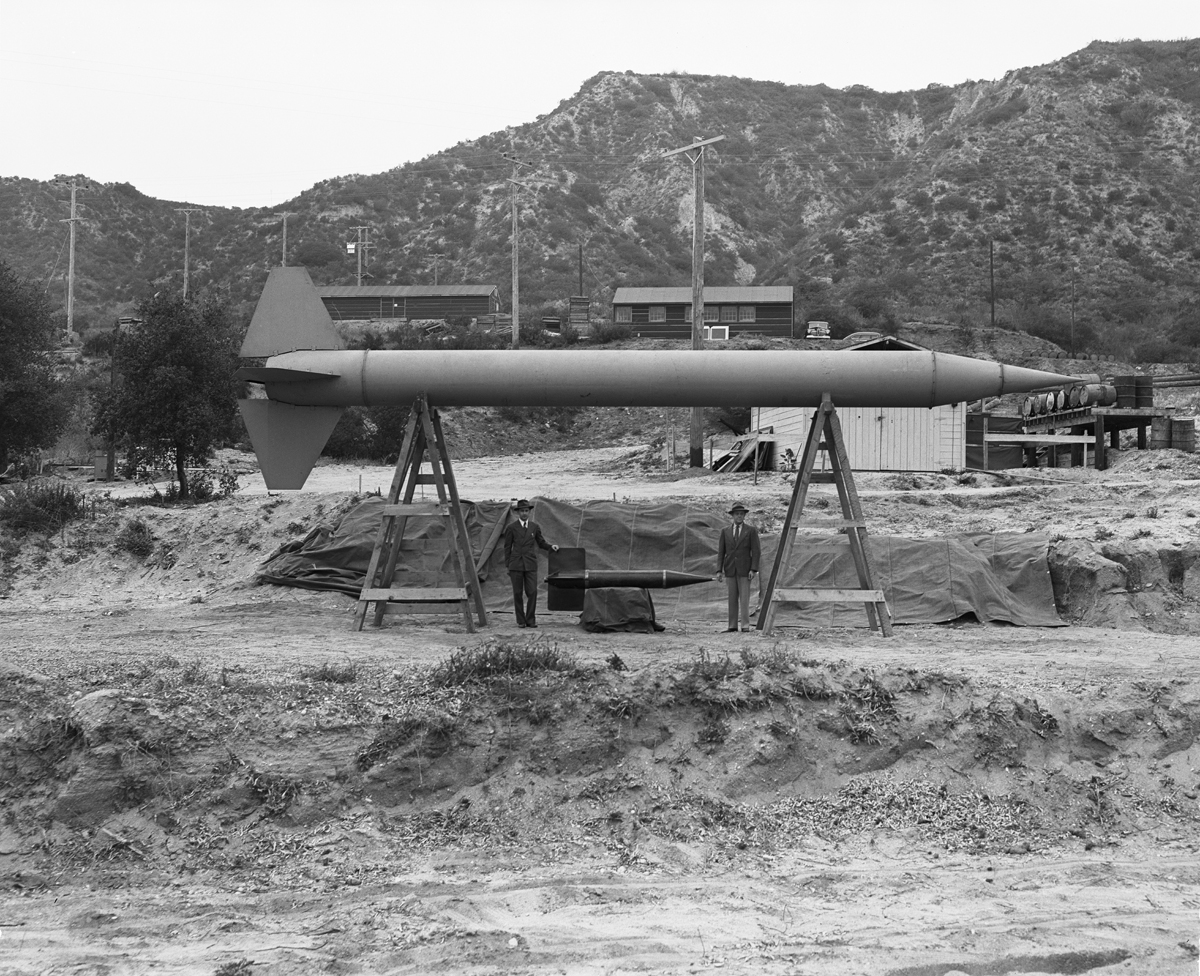
- Major General Gladeon M. Barnes (right) and JPL Acting Director Frank Malina (left) stand below the 39-foot Corporal E, which was launched in May 1947.
- Type: Experimental guided missile
- Place of origin: United States

Service history
- In service: 1947–1951
- Used by: United States Army

Production history
- Designer: Jet Propulsion Laboratory
- Designed: 1946
- Manufacturer: Douglas Aircraft
- No. built: 11

Specifications
- Mass: 11,700 lb (5,300 kg)
- Length: 39 feet 2 3/8 inches (11.948 m)
- Diameter: 30 in (760 mm)
- Engine: Liquid fuelled rocket 20,000 lbf (89 kN) thrust
- Propellant: Liquid fuel
- Operational range: 62.5 miles (100.6 km)
- Flight ceiling: 24.5 miles (39.4 km)
- Boost time: 60 sec
- Maximum speed: 2,695 ft/s (821 m/s)

The ORDCIT (US Army's Ordnance and California Institute of Technology) program to develop a ballistic missile called Corporal was a progressive one. The original design was called XF30L20,000 which envisioned a 30 in (760 mm) diameter liquid fueled missile with a 20,000 lbf (89 kN) thrust engine and was ventured in the summer of 1944. The WAC Corporal sounding rocket was developed in 1945, providing experience with liquid fueled ballistic rocketry. The second phase gave experience with a redesigned and refined rocket and engine the following year. What was learned was applied to the Corporal program.

== Creating the Corporal E ==
The major development problems that were to be encountered with the XF30L20,000 were guidance and the increased size of the rockets engine. The original time schedule was excessively optimistic especially as it envisioned the development of a turbo pump for propellants.

The biggest problem was guidance as it was essentially unbroken ground. To provide as much data as possible a telemetry system was required. It was determined that an autopilot guidance system was required and that a means of radio guidance to control roll, pitch and yaw, would also be needed. Graphic mapping of the missile's flight would be performed by two radar plotting boards. The guidance system of the first few rounds of Corporal E were to be supplied by Sperry Gyroscope Company largely from existing units because of the time required to develop special units. Primary control was to be via vanes extending into the rocket exhaust. Ten channels of telemetry were envisioned to be displayed on graphic recorders to provide data to the missile operators. It was the intent of the people conducting the program to have the capability to control the rocket's flight with a control stick to observe flight characteristics. The intent was following the first few flights to have the operator hit a predetermined target.

At the end of WWII the Corporal E programs adjusted to a less ambitious schedule and the WAC Corporal program was adjusted to provide more experience and design information.

Work on the Corporal F with turbo pump instead of compressed air pressure propellant feed was halted with few parts produced.and the Corporal G study of a chemical gas generator to pressurize the fuel tanks was terminated as well. The Corporal E was designed by JPL, with the first 4 airframes built by Douglas Aircraft Company, rocket motors and telemetry equipment were produced by JPL, Sperry Gyroscope provided the autopilot, Army Ordnance the Doppler and Position transponder, and the Signal Corps the radar tracking beacon.

== Testing the Corporal E ==
The first of the three pre-production missiles was fired at White Sands Proving Ground on 22 May 1947 with satisfactory results with a range of 62.5 miles (100.6 km) and an altitude of 24.5 miles (39,400 m). The second Corporal E was a failure on 17 July 1947. The third Corporal E was a partial success on 4 November 1947. Thrust ceased after 43 seconds and an altitude of 66,000 ft (20,000 m) and range of 14 miles (23 km) were achieved. Telemetry reveals fluctuations in amplitude and frequency of pressure in the motor chamber.

As a results of the first three flights the Army Ordnance Department decided to use the Corporal E as a means of developing the means of enlarging its experience in manufacturing guided missiles. There was also interest in developing the basic design to improve performance and reliability. To achieve these goals a further seven rockets were contracted for. Improving the Corporal E involved drastic changes in the rocket motor, airframe, guide vanes and control system. The design was changed to a more easily produced, assembled, and accessible structure. The means of launching was changed from the rocket sitting upon its fins to being held by four arms holding it above the fins which would retract to release it. The first of the redesigned Corporal E missiles was available in May 1949.

Corporal E number 4 was launched on 7 June 1949 and was a failure due to guidance failure. It was determined that the guidance system was unreliable. It was determined that the guidance system being developed for the Sergeant missile was sufficiently developed to be used so it replaced the Corporal E's system. It was also determined that the revised airframe had allowed damage to the control system. Considerable changes in the program were being promoted in Washington with Ordnance Department pushing for the development of a guided missile as a weapon. There was pressure to develop a missile for service by 1954. Corporal was further along than he competing GE Hermes program and was thus selected to develop a weapon, not just an experimental vehicle.

The Corporal E launch program restarted with Corporal E number 5 on 11 July 1950, which was partially successful, as was Corporal E number 6. Changes were made in the control system, and it achieved reliable service. Changes in the fuel system also improved reliability.

Corporal E number 7 introduced the quick shutoff valve to increase accuracy and the 19 cell air tank. Rockets 8 and 9 both showed failures in range both under and over. Electronics failure due to vibration was suspected and addressed. Corporal E 10 was not fired and number 11 which flew on 11 October 1951 was essentially the basic configuration of the Corporal ballistic missile the Army wanted including the new fin configuration. The Corporal E number 11 went off course towards Las Cruces. Corporal E number 5 had marked the effective end of Corporal E test vehicle development as the Corporal E had been selected for development into a guided missile weapon. The Corporal had been a most flexible program developing from WAC Corporal A and B to the early Corporal E to the limited production Corporal E. There was even a study done as to using the Corporal E in an anti-aircraft role. The Corporal Project proceeded with the development of the MGM-5 Corporal.
