= Private (rocket) =

Experimental rocket

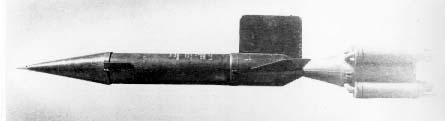
- Private F
- Function: experimental rocket
- Manufacturer: Guggenheim Aeronautical Laboratory
- Country of origin: United States

Size
- Height: 2.34 metres (7 ft 8 in)
- Diameter: 240 millimetres (9.6 in)
- Width: 0.86 metres (2 ft 10 in) finspan
- Mass: 240 kilograms (529 lb)
- Stages: two

Launch history
- Status: Retired
- Launch sites: Camp Irwin, Fort Bliss
- Total launches: 41
- First flight: December 1, 1944; 81 years ago
- Last flight: April 13, 1945

booster stage – T22
- Powered by: 4
- Maximum thrust: 24.5 kN (5,500 lb_{f}) each
- Burn time: 0:00.2 seconds
- Propellant: solid

sustainer stage
- Powered by: 1
- Maximum thrust: 4.4 kN (990 lb_{f})
- Burn time: 0:30 seconds
- Propellant: solid

Private was an experimental rocket developed by the California Institute of Technology on behalf of the United States Army. Tested in two different configurations, it provided the proof of concept that a fin-stabilized ballistic missile was technologically feasible, and led to the development of the Corporal ballistic missile. The Private was the first in a series of JPL rocket designs for the US Army, whose names correspond to the progression in Army enlisted ranks, leading to WAC Corporal, Corporal E, MGM-5 Corporal and finally Sergeant.

== History ==
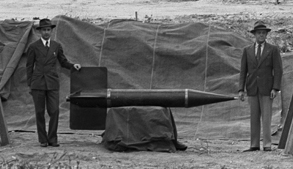
Major General Gladeon M. Barnes (right) and JPL Acting Director Frank Malina stand near a Private mockup in 1945.

The Private program was begun in 1944 as an outgrowth of work by the California Institute of Technology's Guggenheim Aeronautical Laboratory that had produced the first practical jet-assisted take-off (JATO) rockets. The ORDCIT (Ordnance Department California Institute of Technology) project was the Private A which was initiated on May 24, 1944. The Guggenheim Aeronautical Laboratory, California Institute of Technology (GALCIT) was reorganized as the Jet Propulsion Laboratory. The objective was to progressively increase the size and range of missiles. A GALCIT JATO rocket motor was used for research into the development of ballistic missiles. The first flight of the Private A rocket, developed under the direction of Tsien Hsue-shen, took place in December 1944, conducted at Camp Irwin in California.

Private A (XF10S1000) was an unguided, fin-stabilised ballistic rocket; it consisted of a JATO unit equipped with cruciform tail fins, and a set of four T22 booster rockets that were jettisoned after launch. This made Private A the first multistage rocket to be flown in the United States. The gross weight of Private A was 500 pounds. 24 launches of Private A were conducted at Leach Springs, Camp Irwin between December 1 and December 16, 1944. The tests were considered successful, Private A proving capable of flights of 18,000 metres (20,000 yd), and in January 1945 full funding for the ballistic missile program was provided, with GALCIT changing its name to Jet Propulsion Laboratory.

A new version of Private, Private F, was developed; the rocket was similar to Private A, except an aircraft-like tail assembly was fitted instead of Private A's cruciform fins with forward canard surfaces. The purpose of Private F was to determine the behavior of rockets with wings. Private F was flown from a launcher adjustable in elevation. There were a number of configurations tested though they all were of the same basic configuration.

A test series of Private F launches was conducted at Hueco Range, Fort Bliss in Texas between April 1 and April 13, 1945. These tests included two with dummy Private F bodies with only the boosters live. The Private F had the propellant charge reduced from 191 to 175 pounds (87 to 79 kg) to allow a 20 pounds (9.1 kg) slow burning charge to provide tracking after engine burnout. 17 launches were conducted, however none of them were successful; the rocket proving to have serious stability problems. Every one of them rolled within seconds of launch. It was determined that while fin stabilisation was workable, a winged missile would require an autopilot.

Following the conclusion of the Private program, the lessons learned were applied to the development of the SSM-A-17 Corporal ballistic missile.
