= Black Rock (missile) =

Nuclear missile for the British Army

Black Rock, a Rainbow Code name, was a proposed battlefield nuclear missile designed by English Electric for the British Army. Black Rock was to be the 200 miles (320 km) long-ranged part of a trio of nuclear armed weapons, with the Yellow Anvil nuclear artillery shell for short range use and Red Rose in the medium range up to about 30 miles (48 km).

Black Rock was abandoned in 1954, having never been more than a design study, likely due to it competing with the Royal Air Force's deep strike role. English Electric won the contest for Red Rose as well, which was later modified to become Blue Water, which was ultimately cancelled as well.

== History ==
At the end of World War II, the British Army's Guided Weapons Committee had developed a list of seven projects to consider in the post-war era. Among these were a range of nuclear armed weapons intended to provide coverage over short, medium and long range. Given the general assumption that another war was at least 10 years off, and the generally poor economy, little work on these systems was carried out until the opening of the Cold War.

By 1954 the plans had been firmed up. The short-range role was given to Yellow Anvil, a small warhead that could be shot from large conventional artillery. This project was subsequently cancelled. The medium and long range roles were to be filled by missiles. English Electric won development contracts for both, which the Ministry of Supply gave the names "Red Rose" and "Black Rock" respectively in August 1956.

Black Rock did not progress beyond the initial design study. There is no formal decision on record, but observers suggest that the range of the weapon made it overlap its duties with a role that the Royal Air Force considered its own domain. (Note: The US Air Force had a similar attitude about deep strike, which led to the Army being forced to hand over its Jupiter missiles to the Air Force.)

Not all was lost for the team, as they were given a development contract for Red Rose in November 1954. This weapon went through several rounds of development before emerging in a slightly longer-ranged air-mobile form known as Blue Water. This was later canceled.
