= Guggenheim Aeronautical Laboratory =

Laboratory at the California Institute of Technology

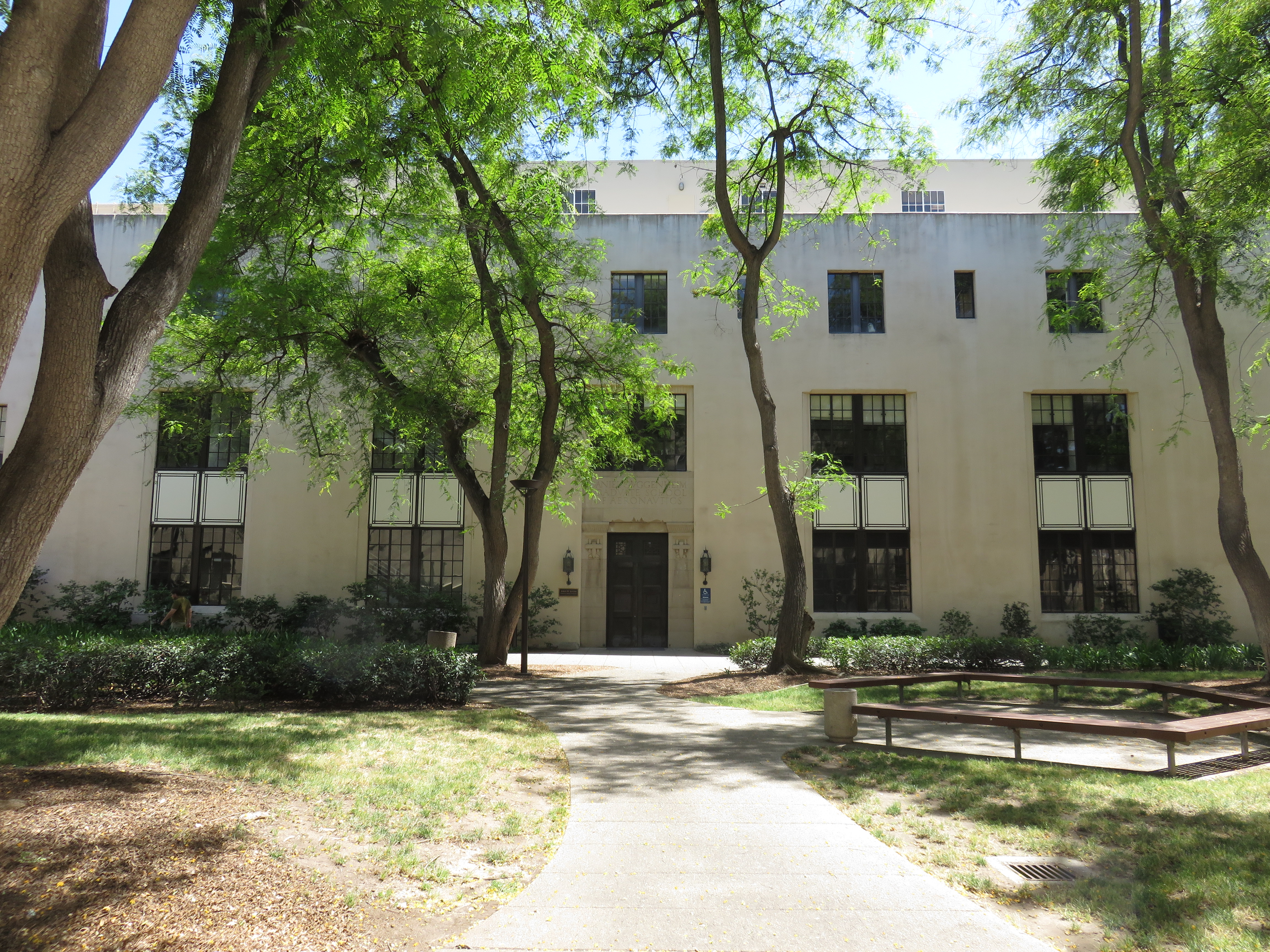
The Guggenheim Aeronautical Laboratory building at Caltech in 2017

The Guggenheim Aeronautical Laboratory at the California Institute of Technology (GALCIT), was a research institute created in 1926, at first specializing in aeronautics research. In 1930, Hungarian scientist Theodore von Kármán accepted the directorship of the lab and emigrated to the United States. Under his leadership, work on rockets began there in 1936. GALCIT was the first—and from 1936 to 1940 the only—university-based rocket research center. Based on GALCIT's JATO project at the time, the Jet Propulsion Laboratory was established under a contract with the United States Army in November 1943.

In 1961 the GALCIT acronym was retained while the name changed to Graduate Aeronautical Laboratories at the California Institute of Technology. In 2006, during the directorship of Ares Rosakis, GALCIT was once again renamed, taking on the new name Graduate Aerospace Laboratories of the California Institute of Technology (while continuing to maintain the acronym GALCIT) in order to reflect its vigorous re-engagement with space engineering and with JPL.

== Founding ==
Daniel Guggenheim and his son, Harry Guggenheim (an aviator), established the Daniel Guggenheim Fund for the Promotion of Aeronautics on June 16, 1926. Between 1926 and 1930 the fund disbursed $3 million, making grants that established schools or research centers at New York University, Stanford University, the University of Michigan, the Massachusetts Institute of Technology, the University of Washington, the Georgia Institute of Technology, Harvard University, Syracuse University, Northwestern University, the University of Akron, and the California Institute of Technology. It was the Guggenheims who, along with Caltech president Robert Andrews Millikan, convinced von Kármán to emigrate to the United States and become director of GALCIT. Eventually, the National Advisory Committee for Aeronautics (NACA) became so concerned about GALCIT's growing influence over West coast aviation, it erected the Ames Laboratory in Sunnyvale, California in part to deter an ever-widening aeronautical gap that had formed between NACA and GALCIT.

== Rocket Research Project ==
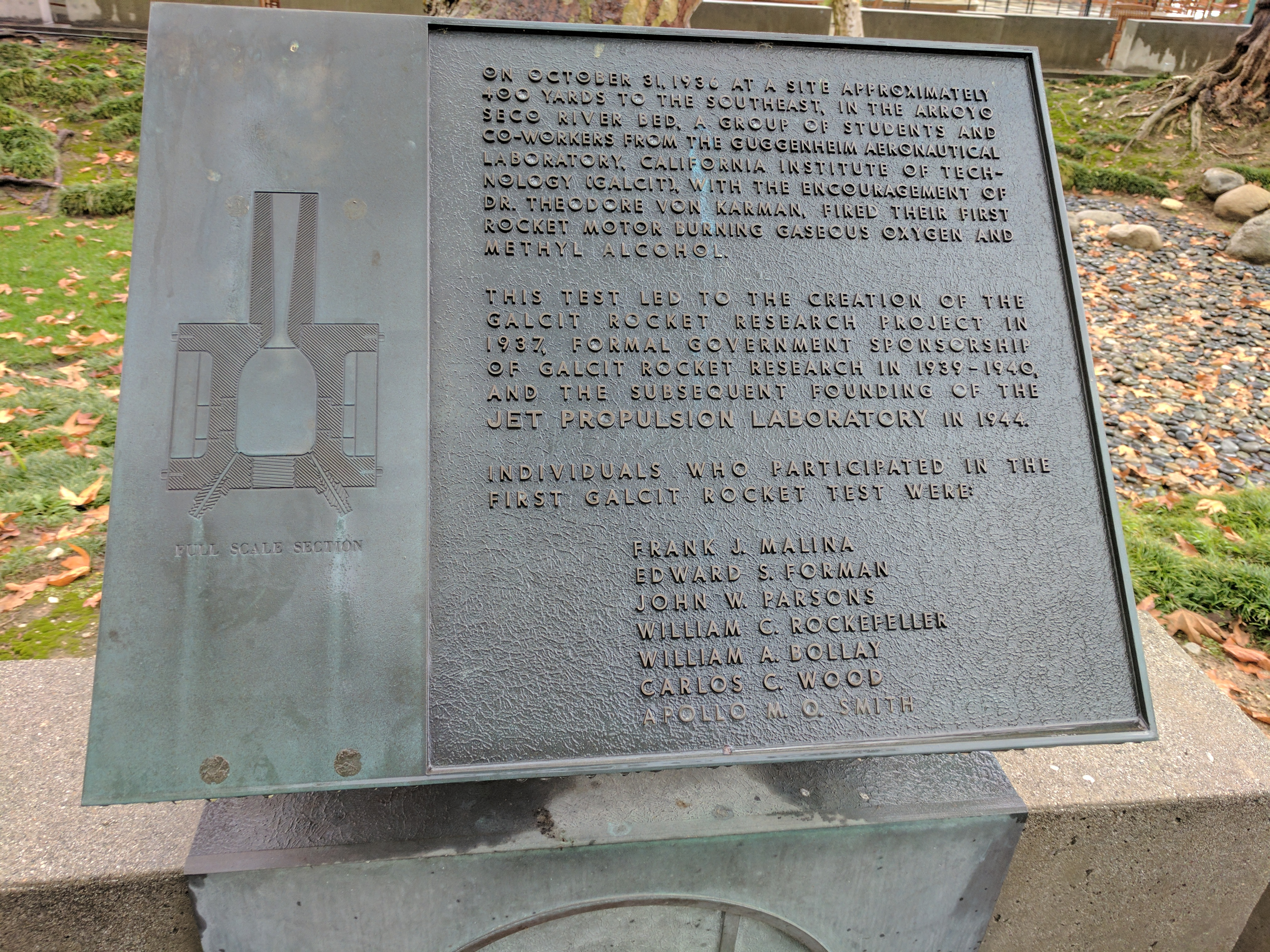
A plaque at the Jet Propulsion Laboratory commemorating the first GALCIT liquid propellant rocket engine test firing

Frank J. Malina began part-time work at the GALCIT ten-foot wind tunnel, the Southern California Cooperative Wind Tunnel. In 1935 he became a Graduate Assistant in the lab. In early 1936, with the aid of a graduate assistant to von Kármán, William Bollay, Malina and two rocket enthusiasts -- Jack Parsons and Edward S. Forman—began the GALCIT Rocket Research Project. They were soon joined by two GALCIT graduate students, Tsien Hsue-shen and A.M.O. Smith. In October they tested for the first time their gaseous oxygen - methyl alcohol rocket motor. They used an area of the Arroyo Seco on the western edge of Pasadena, "a stone’s throw from the present-day Jet Propulsion Laboratory." After a series of tests, they tested the motor in that location for the last time in January 1937; it ran for 44 seconds at a chamber pressure of 75 psi. In March, Weld Arnold, then an assistant in the Astrophysical Laboratory at Caltech, joined the group as a photographer. Tests of a motor that used nitrogen dioxide as the oxidizer were conducted in the GALCIT lab. A misfire of that motor gained the project the nickname, "The Suicide Squad." During 1938 Smith went to work for Douglas Aircraft. Arnold left Caltech for New York. Tsien devoted more of his time to completing his doctorate. Malina, Parsons and Forman continued with the project.

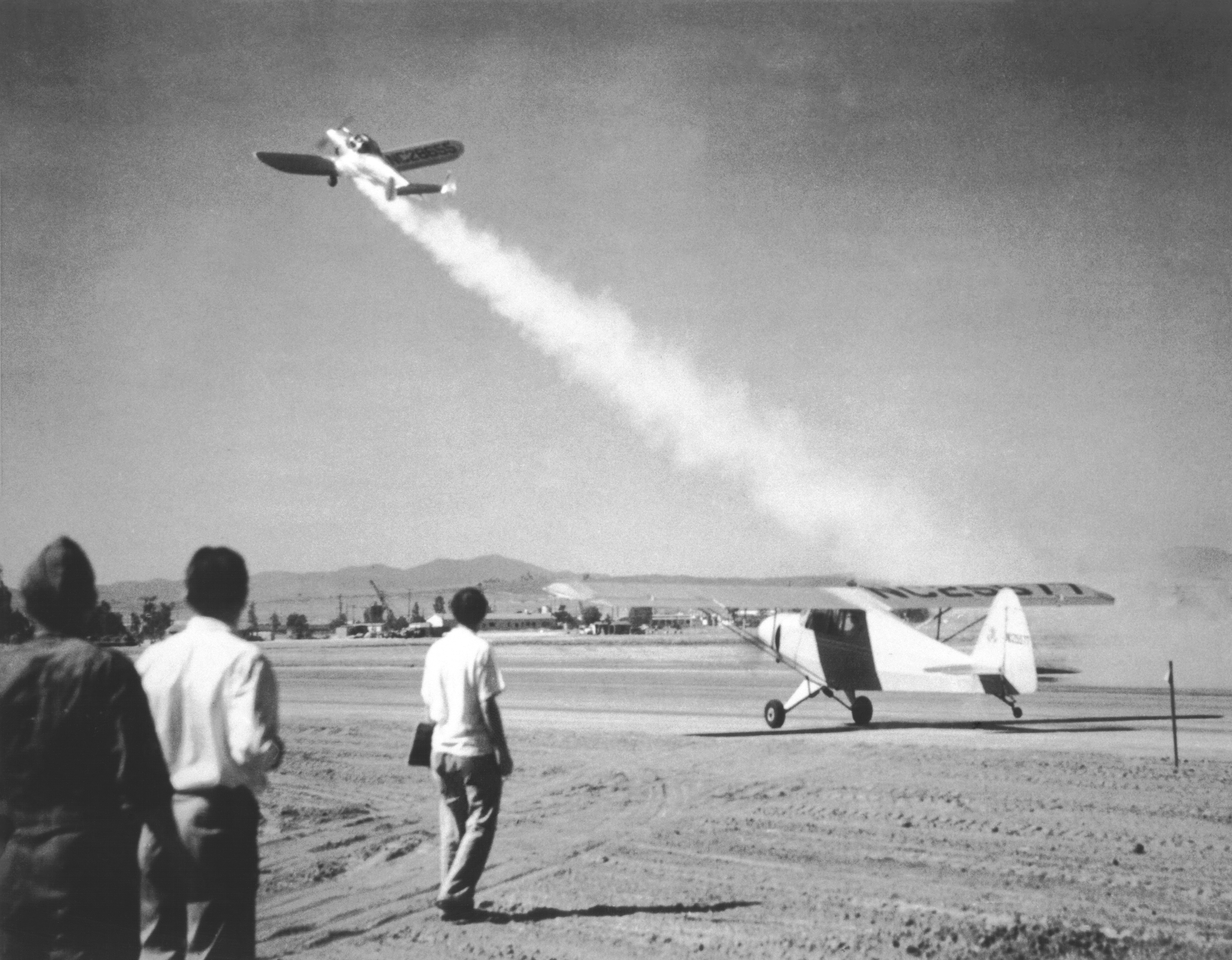
Take-off on August 12, 1941 of America's first "rocket-assisted" fixed-wing aircraft, an Ercoupe fitted with a GALCIT developed solid propellant JATO booster

In early 1939, the National Academy of Sciences provided $1,000 to von Kármán and the Rocket Research Group to research rocket-assisted take-off of aircraft. This JATO research was the first rocket research to receive financial support from the U.S. government. In 1942, Rolf Sabersky was hired to work in mechanical design on the Southern California Cooperative Wind Tunnel under Mark Serrurier and Hap Richards.

== U.S. Army missiles ==
In 1943 the Army Air Forces asked GALCIT to study the possible use of rockets to propel long-range missiles. In response, Malina and Tsien wrote a report dated 20 November 1943, which was the first document to use the Jet Propulsion Laboratory name. Von Kármán added a cover memorandum, signing it as "Director, Jet Propulsion Laboratory," but as far as Caltech was concerned JPL did not yet formally exist. In early 1944 the United States Army asked GALCIT to develop missiles for field use, which led to the development of the Private, Corporal, and Sergeant missiles. The Army Ordnance Corps established the ORDCIT Project, and JPL/GALCIT was formally organized to carry out this work. Later, in a history of early rocketry Malina wrote that the work of the JPL was "considered to include" the research carried out by the GALCIT Rocket Research Group from 1936 on.

== Directors ==
- 1930-1949, Theodore von Kármán
- 1949-1966, Clark Blanchard Millikan
- 1972-1985, Hans Wolfgang Liepmann
- 1987–2003, Hans G. Hornung
- 2004-2009, Ares J. Rosakis
- 2009–2015, Guruswami Ravichandran
- 2015–present, Morteza Gharib

== See also ==
- Aerojet
- Ernest Edwin Sechler
- NACA
- Verein für Raumschiffahrt
