= Blue Water (missile) =

British missile

Blue Water was a British battlefield nuclear missile of the early 1960s, intended to replace the MGM-5 Corporal, which was becoming obsolete. With roughly the same role and range as Corporal, the solid-fuel Blue Water was far simpler to use and would be significantly easier to support in the field. It was seen as a replacement for Corporal both in the UK as well as other NATO operators, notably Germany and possibly Turkey.

The design traces its history to the shorter-ranged but otherwise similar Red Rose design of 1954. In 1958, significantly changed requirements could be filled by the same missile but entirely different support equipment, which led to the project being renamed. The Blue Water missile entered testing in 1962 was generally successful, and praised in the industry. However, when Germany purchased the MGM-29 Sergeant instead of Blue Water, and it appeared Turkey would do the same, the UK government decided to cancel its development instead of continuing to develop a missile that would be used only by their own forces.

Red Rose and Blue Water were code names assigned randomly by the Ministry of Supply based on their Rainbow Code system.

== History ==
=== Origins ===
In the late World War II period, the British Army formed the Guided Weapons Committee to consider their needs for missile weapons. They identified seven designs of interest, mostly surface-to-air and surface-to-surface missiles. In the surface-to-surface role, they identified the need for three nuclear armed weapons, for short, medium and long range use. Given the general feeling that another war was at least ten years off, and the poor post-war economy, little work on these plans was carried out.

The opening of the Cold War led to new priorities, and by 1954 the missiles were once again being seriously considered. By this time, it was decided that the short-range mission was to be filled by a new nuclear artillery shell, Yellow Anvil, leaving only the two longer-range designs. English Electric (EE) won the initial contract for a design study on the long range weapon, which became known as Black Rock under the Ministry of Supply's Rainbow Code system. The project was abandoned, with observers suggesting it was due to its role overlapping with the Royal Air Forces deep strike mission which they considered their own.

=== Red Rose ===
In November 1954, English Electric was also handed a development contract for the medium-range missile. This was given the code name Red Rose in August 1956. Leslie Bedford, Director of Engineering at EE's Stevenage division, initially proposed adapting their Red Shoes surface-to-air missile (SAM) for this role. Red Shoes became known as Thunderbird when it entered service with the Army in 1959. The modified design was referred to as the 30-mile RS Conversion, but may have also been known as Red Herring, although whether this an official Rainbow Code or simply a nickname is not known.

Given the much heavier 1,000 pounds (450 kg) warhead compared to the one used in the anti-aircraft role, the RS conversion required extra thrust for takeoff. To supply this, it added two more of the Red Shoes' Gosling solid fuel rocket boosters for a total of six. Like Red Shoes, the missile was mounted on a transporter-erector-launcher (TEL) towed by a Bedford RLHC truck and then raised to about 45 degrees for launch. For guidance, they proposed using the AA No. 3 Mk. 7 gun laying radar to accurately measure its trajectory during launch and compare that to a pre-computed path and send corrections via radio. The War Ministry was not impressed, having found that Red Shoes was difficult to maneuver during transit with four boosters and concerned that six would make it even more difficult, especially as the fins on the boosters had to be enlarged to provide more stability for the heavier missile.

Unknown to either EE or the Army at the time, Vickers also began development of a weapon to fill the same role, the "35 mile Artillery Weapon System". Their design was a single-stage solid fuel rocket in a dedicated TEL. The initial design was to make the TEL look like a normal trailer and haul it as a semi-trailer, which would allow it to be hidden among motor pool vehicles. A later proposal used a dedicated single-piece TEL with its own prime mover fixed to the trailer. Although initially interested, the Army eventually decided against this design because it flew at the relatively slow speed of Mach 1.3 (1,590 km/h; 990 mph) and reached an altitude of only 10,000 feet (3,000 m), which would allow it to be attacked by SAMs.

The final entry was from Bristol, the "RP.15", which, like EE, proposed adapting a version of their Red Duster missile, later known as Bloodhound. It is unclear whether this was seriously considered for the role.

=== New Red Rose ===
In 1956 the Corporal missile had been adopted by the Royal Artillery as a battlefield tactical nuclear missile, filling much the same role as Red Rose. This missile was liquid-fuelled, and required a large convoy of support vehicles to prepare it for launch, which was a slow process. It also required continual command guidance in flight, yet only achieved relatively poor accuracy. Also in use within the Royal Artillery was the Honest John rocket. This was solid-fuelled and could be launched rapidly, but was unguided and had only short range. There was a clear requirement for a missile that would combine the range of the Corporal, the ease-of-use and rapid reaction of Honest John, and a new guidance system with higher accuracy than either.

EE had won the contract for servicing both of these missiles in the field, and it was no surprise when the Army turned to them to consider a proposal to fill a new Red Rose. EE returned a new design, sometimes referred to as "Red Rock Ab Initio", using a single larger rocket engine. The missile would be carried on a AEC Militant converted as a TEL, but the launch pad was separate, towed behind the TEL on a small trailer. For launch, the trailer was dropped to the ground and the TEL backed up and used hydraulic rams to lift the missile to vertical and sit it on the pad. After launch, as the thrust dropped, a set of stabilizing fins at the extreme rear would drop off to improve aerodynamics, as they were only needed during launch when the missile was flying at slower speeds.

=== Corps Support Rocket, Blue Water ===
In 1958, the Army changed the requirements for the system, demanding it be air-portable. They later extended the range to a desired 60 miles (97 km). A new Operational Requirement was released, A5077, for a "short-range corps support weapon" that was solid-fuelled with autonomous guidance and requiring only simple support equipment for launch. It also took advantage of the shrinking dimensions and weight of nuclear warheads and so only required a much smaller payload.

Given the lighter warheads, Red Rose could meet the range requirements without any changes to the rocket. But the two-part TEL was a problem as it would not fit into the RAF's standard Argosy transport aircraft. EE responded by making relatively small modifications to their last Red Rose proposal. The missile remained largely the same, but reshaped the wings and control fins removed the drop-off fins. The major change was to the TEL, which was now a single vehicle based on the Bedford RLHC. As the missile now flew beyond the radar horizon of the launch site, it was guided entirely through an inertial platform. After being raised, the missile was carefully levelled using a built-in theodolite and then the trajectory was calculated using a computer in an accompanying Land Rover.

The changes were significant enough to grant it a new name, "Blue Water". The resulting design was significantly similar to the later MGM-52 Lance that would fill the same role in the US Army in the 1970s.

=== Development ===
A suitable warhead of 10 kiloton began development at Atomic Weapons Establishment (AWRE). Codenamed ‘Tony’, this was a UK version of the US W44 Tsetse primary. The Propellant and Explosives Research and Manufacturing Establishment (PERME) developed the solid rocket motor based on the successful Cuckoo originally developed for the Black Knight experimental rocket. The engines were built by Bristol Siddeley Engines Ltd. It gave a thrust of 1,700 pounds-force (7,600 N). Initial testing of the engine suggested it would be underpowered, and in 1959 the Ministry of Supply issued a contract to Bristol Aerojet for a new design.

The first test vehicle flew in 1960 from Aberporth followed by full-range trials at Woomera.

=== Cancellation ===
Initial hopes for Blue Water had been optimistic, seeing it as a NATO-wide replacement for the clearly obsolete Corporal. The anticipated customer was the West German Bundeswehr, but there were serious expectations that this would become standard equipment across NATO. There was even the possibility of sales to the non-NATO Switzerland, which would be equipped with a French warhead instead. To improve the chances of sales into Europe, the weapon was the first UK design to be dimensioned in metric.

The US replacement for Corporal was the Sergeant. Sergeant was solid-fuelled and generally comparable to Blue Water, although it was more complex and slower to operate and, like Corporal, still required a train of semi-trailer vehicles. It was however promised for delivery in 1961. In 1960 West Germany agreed to buy Sergeant rather than to wait for Blue Water. As this represented the other major customer for Blue Water, and also the likelihood that other potential customers such as Turkey and Italy would then follow this American path, the sales prospects for Blue Water became bleak.

The programme was cancelled on 10 August 1962, as the UK government, whilst still wishing to purchase the missile, was no longer willing to fund the entire development costs itself. The total costs were estimated at around £32.1 million. Additional funding already earmarked for Blue Water was instead directed to TSR-2. This, and other similar cancellations in this period, were a source of considerable criticism for years to come.

At the time, it was suggested that the cancellation was also the outcome of a successful program to better integrate the RAF and Army. The program, started in 1960, aimed to improve air-ground coordination, allowing RAF aircraft to be used more effectively in the close-support role. Blue Water was, to a large degree, a replacement for long-range artillery, a role that was easily fulfilled by the RAF's TSR-2, as long as those aircraft were available to the Army on a timely basis. The need for missile artillery was replaced by the immediate availability of flying artillery. This suggestion is backed by public comments at the time of the cancellation; "there are plenty of nuclear weapons in Europe already, and that TSR.2 could cover many of the targets the army had in mind for Blue Water".

Solly Zuckerman, the Chief Scientific Adviser to the incoming Minister of Defense Peter Thorneycroft, was not asked for his opinion on the system. He did, however, readily offer it to the press, stating "My own view, which I made perfectly clear, was that Blue Water should go. While I recognized that PT.428 was highly ambitious from a technical point of view, it made more sense to spend such money as was available on a system that had some ostensible military purpose, rather than on one that I thought had none." His concerns were mostly based on the feeling that any use of nuclear weapons on the battlefield would quickly lead to outright nuclear war, so Blue Water's contribution to the outcome would be close to nothing. In contrast, the PT.428, a rapid-firing SAM missile battery also being developed by EE, had a clear military purpose of attacking enemy tactical aircraft in any war situation, nuclear or not. By this time, however, the War Office had been offered the choice of cancelling PT.428 or Blue Water. The Army decided to cancel the former to save the latter, leaving EE with no ongoing project when both were ultimately cancelled.

=== Air-launched stand-off variant ===
A number of references claim that a version of Blue Water was designed for air-launch by the TSR-2 strike aircraft in the stand-off attack role. The modifications were relatively minor, tapering the rear fuselage and adding a cowling over the rocket nozzle to reduce drag in flight. The fairing would be blown off by the rocket motor when fired. Top secret MoD papers since released reveal that an air-launched version of Blue Water was considered for development, but this development clearly never proceeded, and the project had been abandoned by the time the TSR.2 was cancelled in 1965.

== Description ==
This missile was 25 feet (7.6 m) in length 610 mm diameter and weighed-in at 3,000 pounds (1,400 kg). The fuselage was cylindrical with a tapered nose, without the swelling required for previous large diameter nuclear warheads. The control surfaces were small and of typical English Electric form: four rear fins and four daggerboard shaped all-moving control surfaces at mid-length, indexed at 45° to the tail fins. Guidance was inertial and once aligned before launch, entirely autonomous in flight.

The transporter erector launcher was a modified Bedford RL lorry. Additional launch equipment consisted of an early electronic computer, carried in a Land Rover, together with an alignment theodolite. Missiles were normally to be held under cover until a few minutes before launch, whereupon they would be moved to their launch position and the stabilising jacks beneath the lorry placed in position. These launch positions had been surveyed immediately beforehand, so as to be aligned directly at the target.

Prior to launch, the launch computer was connected to the missile by an umbilical cable. The same theodolite was used to align the on-board gyroscopes before launch and the flight plan settings for the missile were downloaded to it. The launch control vehicle could then move on to prepare another launcher within the battery. Only immediately before launch was the missile raised on its launcher and then fired. Each missile required a remarkably small crew of two, not counting the battery survey team, to operate it.

== See also ==
- List of Rainbow Codes
- Blue Streak
