= Clark Blanchard Millikan =

American academic and aerospace engineer (1903–1966)

Clarke B. Millikan
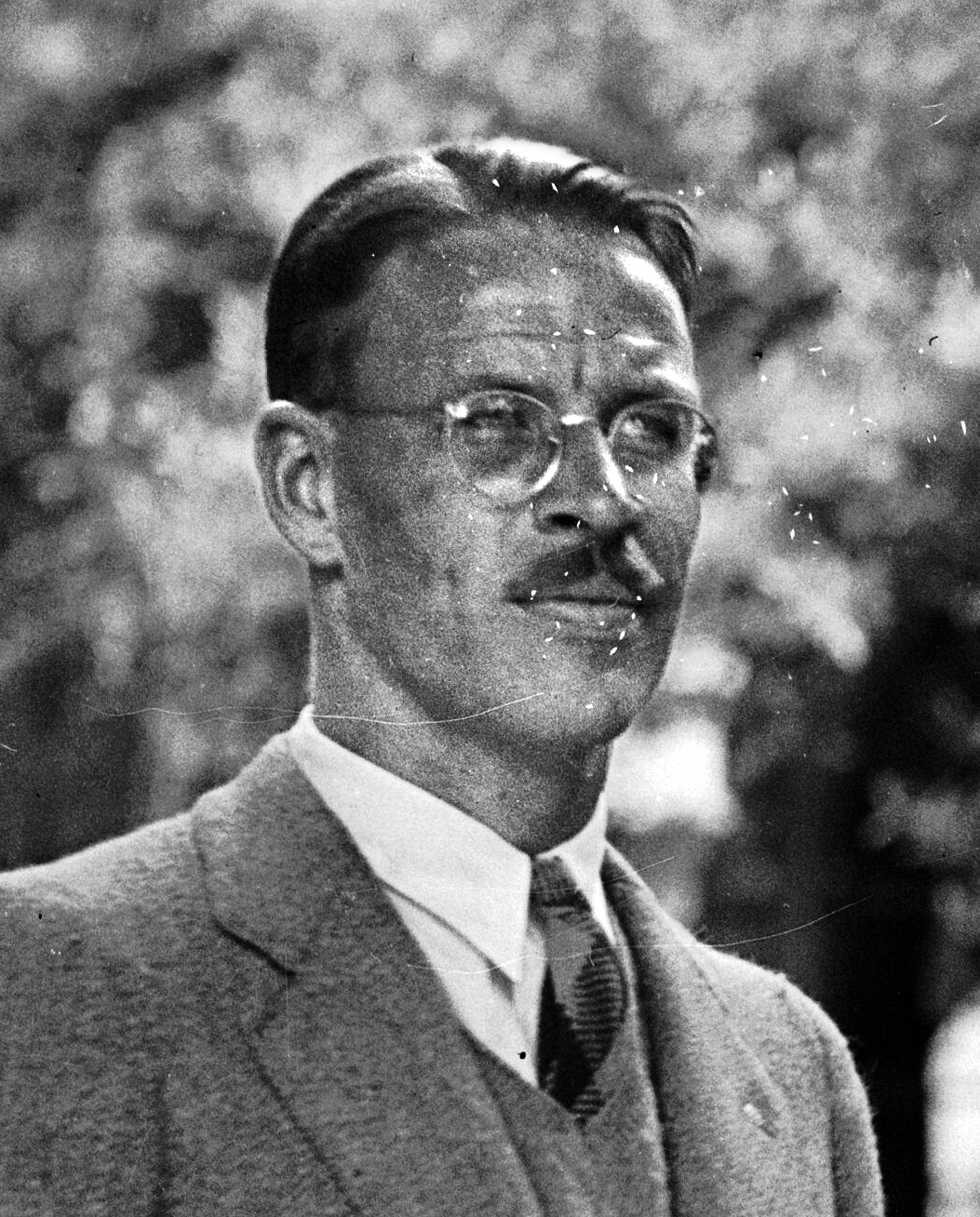
- Born: Clarke Blanchard Millikan; August 23, 1903
- Died: January 2, 1966 (aged 62)
- Awards: Medal for Merit (1949)
- Scientific career
- Fields: Physics
- Workplaces: Jet Propulsion Laboratory; Guggenheim Aeronautical Laboratory; California Institute of Technology; Yale University
- Thesis: Some problems in the steady motion of viscous, incompressible fluids; with particular reference to a variation principle (1928)

Clark Blanchard Millikan (August 23, 1903 – January 2, 1966) was a distinguished professor of aeronautics at the California Institute of Technology (Caltech), and a founding member of the National Academy of Engineering.

== Biography ==
Millikan's parents were noted physicist Robert A. Millikan and Greta Erwin Blanchard. He attended the University of Chicago Laboratory Schools, graduated from Yale College in 1924, then earned his PhD in physics and mathematics at Caltech in 1928 under Professor Harry Bateman. He became a professor upon receiving his degree, full professor of aeronautics in 1940, and director of the Guggenheim Aeronautical Laboratory in 1949.

His first major engineering work began with the construction of large wind tunnels, particularly the Southern California Cooperative Wind Tunnel in Pasadena, which was shared by five major aircraft companies. In 1942, Rolf Sabersky worked in mechanical design on the Southern California Cooperative Wind Tunnel under Mark Serrurier and Hap Richards. Caltech wind tunnels were subsequently used during the design phase of more than 600 types of aircraft and missiles.

He was active in the formation of the Jet Propulsion Laboratory during World War II, and served as chairman of Caltech's Jet Propulsion Laboratory committee from 1949 onwards. He also taught first college course in rocket propulsion in the United States. He authored Aerodynamics of the Airplane.

Millikan received both the Medal for Merit from the U.S. President and the British government's King's Medal for Service in the Cause of Freedom for his World War II work in aeronautics and ballistic missiles. He also served as a member of the Air Force Scientific Advisory Board, Naval Research Advisory Committee, Defense Science Board, and the Scientific Advisory Committee of the Army Ballistic Research Laboratory. He was a fellow of the Royal Aeronautical Society of Great Britain, the American Academy of Arts and Sciences, and the American Physical Society, and an honorary fellow of the American Institute of Aeronautics and Astronautics (having served as president of its predecessor, the Institute of Aeronautical Sciences, in 1937). He was elected to the National Academy of Sciences in 1964 and was a founding member of the National Academy of Engineering.
