= WAC Corporal =

Sounding rocket

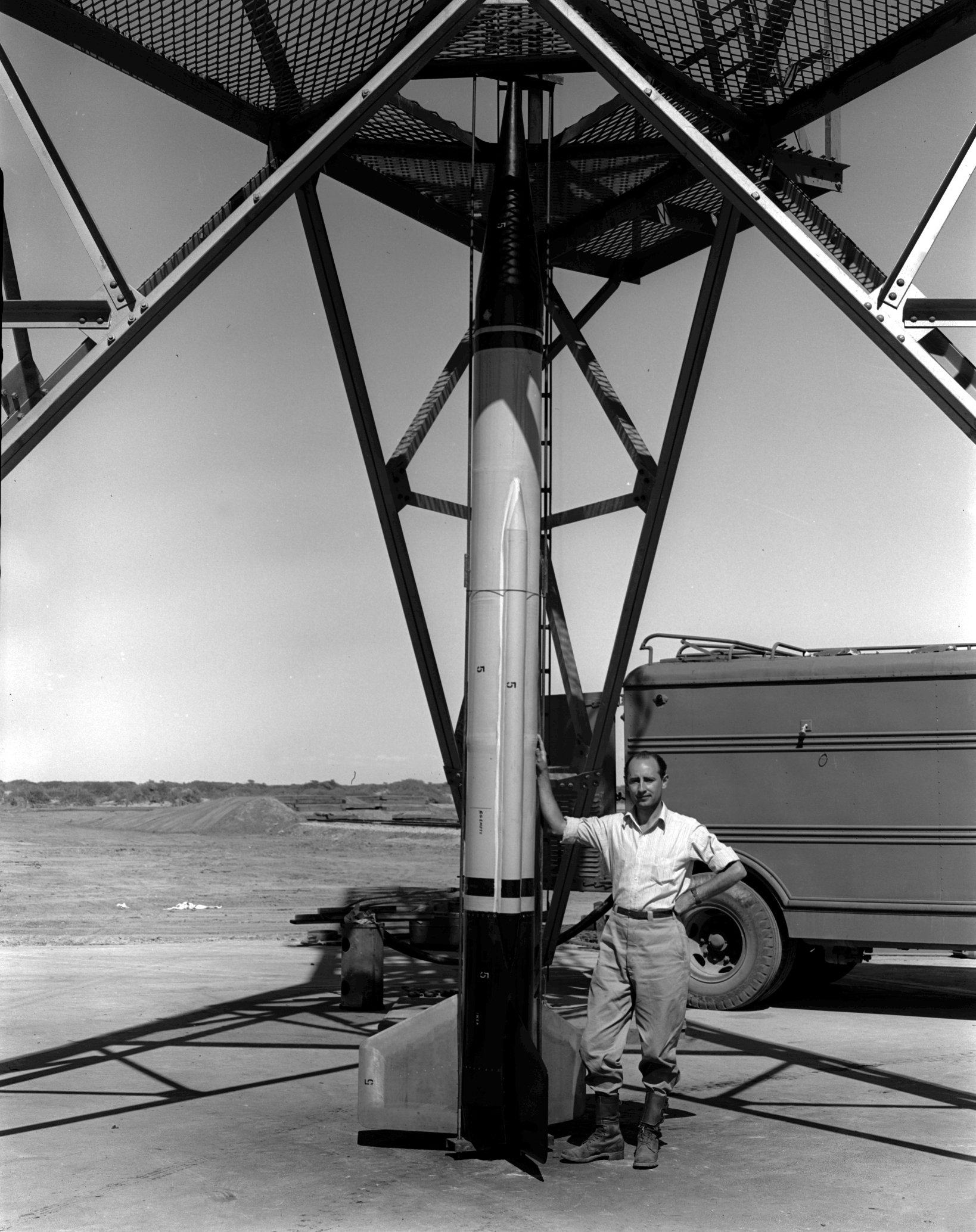
- JPL director Frank Malina with a WAC Corporal rocket (minus the solid-fuel boosters)
- Function: Sounding rocket
- Manufacturer: Douglas Aircraft Corporation, JPL, Aerojet
- Country of origin: United States

Size
- Height: 7.37 m (24.2 ft)
- Diameter: 30 cm (12 in)
- Stages: 1

Launch history
- Status: Retired
- Launch sites: White Sands Missile Range, Cape Canaveral
- First flight: October 11, 1945
- Last flight: July 29, 1950

Booster stage – Tiny Tim
- Gross mass: 344.4 kg (759 lb)
- Propellant mass: 67.4 kg (149 lb)
- Maximum thrust: 220 kN (49,000 lb_{f})
- Burn time: .6 seconds
- Propellant: solid

Sustainer stage – WAC Corporal
- Empty mass: 134.6 kg (297 lb)
- Gross mass: 313.3 kg (691 lb)
- Powered by: Aerojet 38ALDW-1500
- Maximum thrust: 6.7 kN (1,500 lb_{f})
- Burn time: 47 seconds
- Propellant: RFNA + furfuryl alcohol

The WAC Corporal was the first operational sounding rocket developed in the United States. It was an offshoot of the Corporal program, that was started by a partnership between the United States Army Ordnance Corps and the California Institute of Technology (named "ORDCIT") in June 1944 with the ultimate goal of developing a military ballistic missile.

== Development History ==
The California Institute of Technology had been fostering a group of rocket engineers in the 1930s at their Guggenheim Aeronautical Laboratory (GALCIT) including Frank Malina, Jack Parsons, and Edward Forman. They became known as the "suicide squad" because so many of their early experiments at the Laboratory blew up. Some of the GALCIT enthusiasts had founded a business to manufacture rocket motors called Aerojet.

During the first years of World War II, GALCIT had pursued the development of both solid and liquid-fueled Jet Assisted Take Off (JATO) boosters to aid aircraft take off performance. As the group had experimented with rockets for several years before the war they were selected by the Army to pursue ballistic rocket development.

The first rocket designed by the group for the Army was designated as XFS10S100-A, also known as the Private, that being the first Army enlisted rank. The second ORDCIT project, which became the Corporal, named for the next Army enlisted rank, was a project originally named XF30L 20,000. The Corporal project envisioned a liquid propellant missile of 30-inch (760 mm) diameter and a power of 20,000 pounds-force (89 kN). The Signal Corps had created the requirement for a sounding rocket to carry 25 pounds (11 kg) of instruments to 100,000 feet (30 km) or higher. This was merged with a requirement of the Rocket R&D Division of the Ordnance Corps for a test vehicle. Frank Joseph Malina of the Jet Propulsion Laboratory (JPL) proposed the development of a liquid-fueled sounding rocket to meet this request, thus providing a practical developmental step towards the ultimate Corporal missile.

The theoretical work setting the stage for the WAC Corporal was established in a 1943 paper "A Review and Preliminary Analysis of Long-Range Rocket Projectiles" by Malina and Hsue-Shen Tsien. Design was started by Frank Malina and Homer Joe Stewart to meet the Signal Corps' request with their study "Considerations of the Feasibility of Developing a 100,000-ft. Altitude Rocket." The final design work was done by a team of persons specializing in particular areas and involved significant efforts to derive performance from theoretical means (a relatively new method for America rocketry). The key persons responsible were M.M. Mills (booster), P.J. Meeks (sounding rocket), W.A. Sandburg and W.B. Barry (launcher and WAC nose), S.J. Goldberg (field tests) and H.J. Stewart (external ballistics) and G, Emmerson (photography).

For propulsion, the 38ALDW-1500 Aerojet liquid-fueled engine was chosen, which had been developed as a JATO system for Navy flying boats. The 38ALDW-1500 was modified for hypergolic propellants, with red fuming nitric acid as the oxidizer and furfuryl alcohol as the fuel. The WAC Corporal was intended to use a booster derived from the Tiny Tim air-to-ground attack rocket to gain sufficient speed along a launch tower for the Corporal's three tail fins to provide passive stability. Despite the emphasis upon a theoretical approach, it was deemed necessary to empirically prove the Corporal's aerodynamics, especially the three fin configuration, so a solid propellant one-fifth scale model called the Baby WAC was tested from a scaled-down launcher in July 1945. Four Baby WACs were flown.

The design of the WAC Corporal was innovative in that main structure containing the oxidizer, fuel, and pressurizing air tanks was of monocoque design, and that it had only three stabilizing fins, rather than the four that the Army preferred. Since the WAC Corporal was conceived as an atmospheric sounding rocket to be used in part near populated locations, it was provided with a parachute recovery system for the rocket itself, along with a separate system for recovering the Signal Corps radiosonde payload.

The production of the WAC Corporal was by Douglas Aircraft Corporation with critical parts supplied by JPL and the engines by Aerojet.

== Testing ==
The WAC Corporal test program began at White Sands Proving Grounds in late September 1945 with a series of booster tests lofting dummy upper stages. These were the first missiles launched at White Sands. They were launched from what became LC-33, which was also the launch site for many other early missiles such as the V-2, Viking and Hermes. These first launches tested not only the booster, but the launcher and firing controls, as well as providing practice for the radar and camera crews. October saw two launches of the WAC Corporal with one-third propellant load followed by six fully-fueled flights. Several of these flights reached altitudes of approximately 235,000 feet (72 km). Performance varied because of several factors, including variation in the gross weight from 683 to 704 pounds (310 to 319 kg), with empty weights from 289 to 310 pounds (131 to 141 kg).

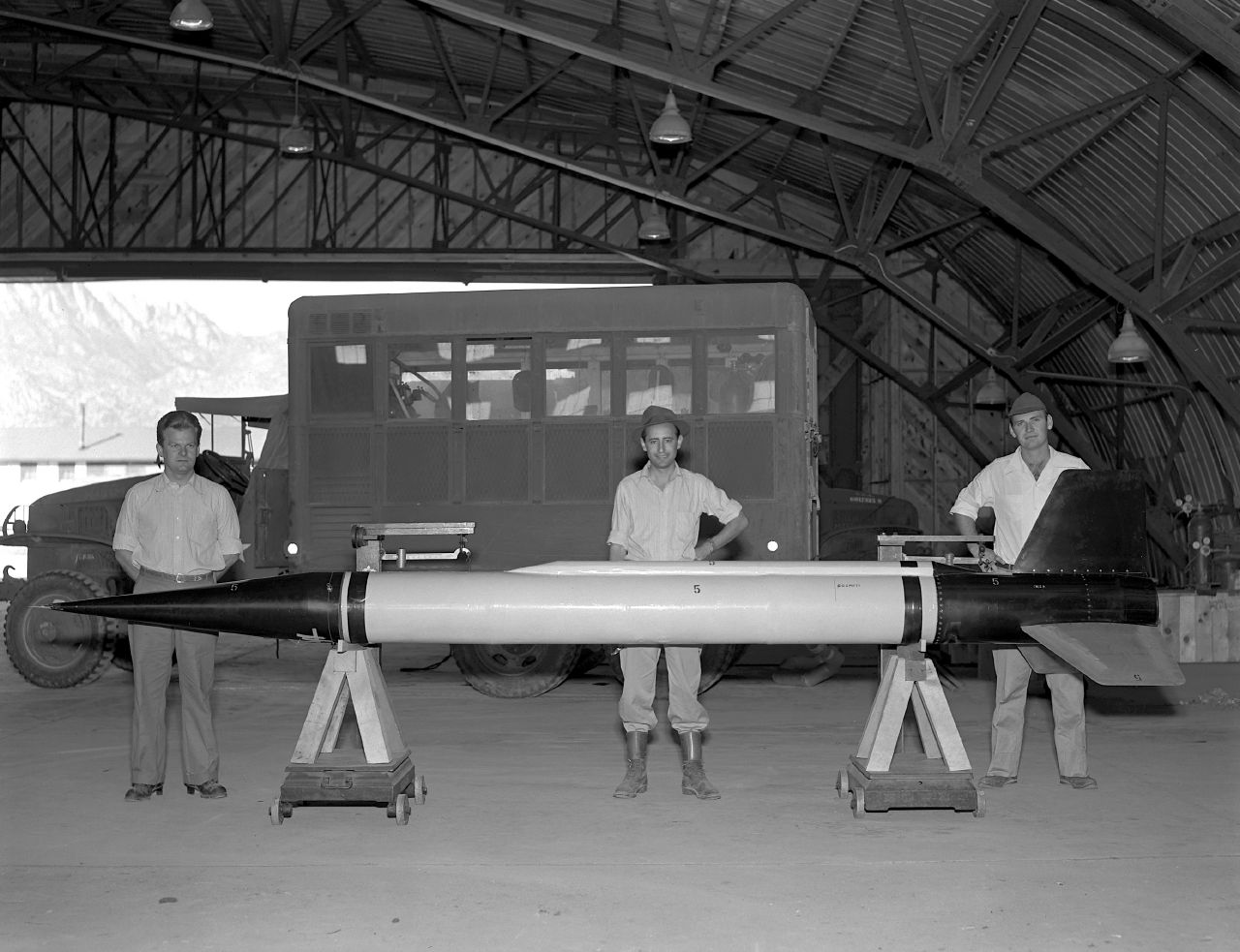
WAC Corporal missile testing in October 1945, at White Sands Proving Ground

The missions flown during the WAC Corporal first series were:

- 2 Booster tests on September 26, 1945
- 2 Booster tests on September 27, 1945
- 1 Booster test with 250-pound (113 kg) load on September 27, 1945
- 1 Booster test with dummy WAC Corporal on September 28, 1945
- 1 WAC Corporal to 235,000 feet (72 km) on October 11, 1945
- 1 WAC Corporal to approximately 235,000 feet on October 12, 1945
- 1 WAC Corporal to 90,000 feet (27 km) due to premature nose release on October 16, 1945
- 1 WAC Corporal to 235,000 feet with premature nose release on October 19, 1945
- 1 WAC Corporal launched with pressurization leak no performance recorded on October 25, 1945
- 1 WAC Corporal launched at night with nose release failure on October 25, 1945

Radar tracking was difficult, as above 90,000 feet (27 km) the radar return was too small to be detected, and radiosonde signals were not received. No previous American liquid-fueled rocket had exceeded a tiny fraction of the altitudes the WAC Corporal regularly achieved. It was decided on November 9, 1945, to alter the WAC Corporal design to improve upon it for another series of flights. This redesigned rocket was first deemed "Sergeant" in keeping with the JPL naming scheme but was soon renamed WAC Corporal B. The name "Sergeant" was later used for a solid propellant missile designed for the United States Army at JPL. Design of the WAC Corporal B was initiated in March 1946 with P.J. Meeks as Project Coordinator, and differed significantly in detail while its basic shape remained the same. It was 4 inches (10 cm) longer, weighed 100 pounds (45 kg) less, and contained 40 pounds (18 kg) less propellant. The designs of the fuel pressurization system and fuel valves were simplified. It had a shorter engine with redesigned injectors weighed 12 pounds (5.4 kg), rather than the longer 50-pound (23 kg) engine of the WAC Corporal A. The drastically redesigned rocket body used separate tanks of dissimilar materials. Larger, lighter fins were supplied, which proved problematic on the first WAC Corporal B flight on December 6, 1946.

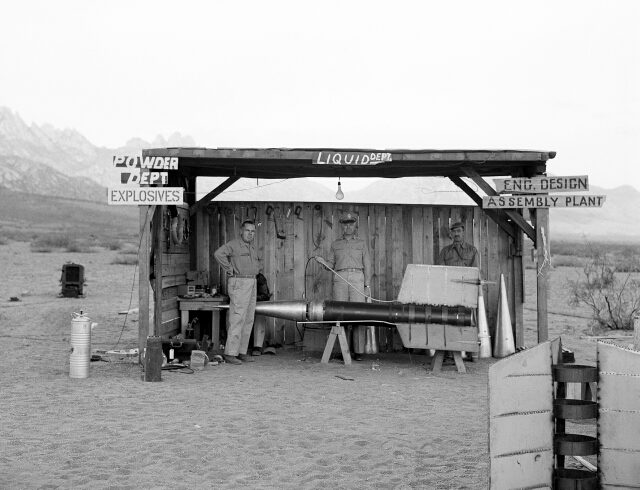
Four men at White Sands in May 1946 with a WAC Corporal booster rocket 293-417

The flights during the second series of WAC Corporal flights were:

- 1 Booster test on May 7, 1946
- 1 Booster test with test of nose cone separation and parachute recovery on May 20, 1946
- 2 Booster tests with test of nose cone separation and parachute recovery on May 23, 1946
- 2 Booster tests with test of nose cone separation and parachute recovery on May 24, 1946
- 2 Booster test with tests of nose cone separation and parachute recovery on May 26, 1946
- 1 Booster test with test of nose cone separation and parachute recovery on May 29, 1946
- 1 Booster test with test of nose cone separation and parachute recovery on December 2, 1946
- 1 WAC Corporal A on December 3 modified with WAC Corporal B fins resulted in fin separation and reached 90,000 feet (27 km)
- 1 first WAC Corporal B lost one fin, unstable reached 92,000 feet (28 km) with successful recovery December 6, 1946
- 1 WAC Corporal B reached 105,000 feet (32 km) recovered slightly damaged December 12, 1946
- 1 WAC Corporal B reached 160,000 feet (49 km) telemetry section recovered December 12, 1946
- 1 WAC Corporal B reached 175,000 feet (53 km) parachute tangled and failed December 13, 1946
- 1 Test of Mark I Mod I booster with load February 17, 1947
- 1 WAC Corporal B reached 144,000 feet (44 km) with lower velocity than expected February 18, 1947
- 1 WAC Corporal B reached 240,000 feet (73 km) parachute failed February 24, 1947
- 1 WAC Corporal B reached 206,000 feet (63 km) good recovery March 3, 1947
- 1 WAC Corporal B reached 198,000 feet (60 km) parachute broke loose June 12, 1947

The WAC Corporal program was an extremely successful test program. The last 6 WAC Corporal Bs to fly were used in the Bumper program as the second stage atop captured V-2 missiles in early air-light and staging experiments. For Bumper, the WAC Corporal was modified to provide stability in excess of Mach 5 by increasing the number of fins to four and increasing their size. The WAC Corporal had to be modified so that the engine ignition would be initiated by the integrating accelerometer of the V-2 stage just before cutoff of the V-2 engine. The WAC Corporal was spin-stabilized by two solid rockets placed between the oxidizer and fuel tanks. The Bumper/WAC had a payload capacity of 50 pounds and carried a Doppler transmitter/receiver which transmitted the nose cone temperature as well as velocity information. There were 6 Bumper flights from White Sands, the first two carrying solid-fueled dummy WACs. Flight number six had a failure on the V-2. Bumper 7 and 8, the last two flights of the Bumper program, were the first launches from the new Joint Long-Range Proving Ground at Cocoa Beach, Florida, which would later be known as Cape Canaveral. The reason for the move was the intention to use a depressed trajectory to achieve velocities in the vicinity of Mach 7 from 120,000 to 150,000 feet (37 to 46 km). This would entail flights downrange in excess of 250 miles (400 km), which would exceed the boundaries of White Sands.

The WAC/Bumper flights were:

- Bu-1 May 15, 1948 Dummy WAC Corporal
- Bu-2 August 10, 1948 Dummy WAC Corporal
- Bu-3 September 30, 1948
- Bu-4 November 1, 1948
- Bu-5 February 24, 1949
- Bu-6 April 21, 1949 first stage failed
- Bu-8 July 24, 1950 at Cape Canaveral pad 3, stage separation error
- Bu-7 July 29, 1950 at Cape Canaveral pad 3

Bumper 7's WAC Corporal, the last one ever to fly, achieved Mach 9, the highest speed ever achieved by a projectile in the atmosphere at the time.

== Outcome and legacy ==
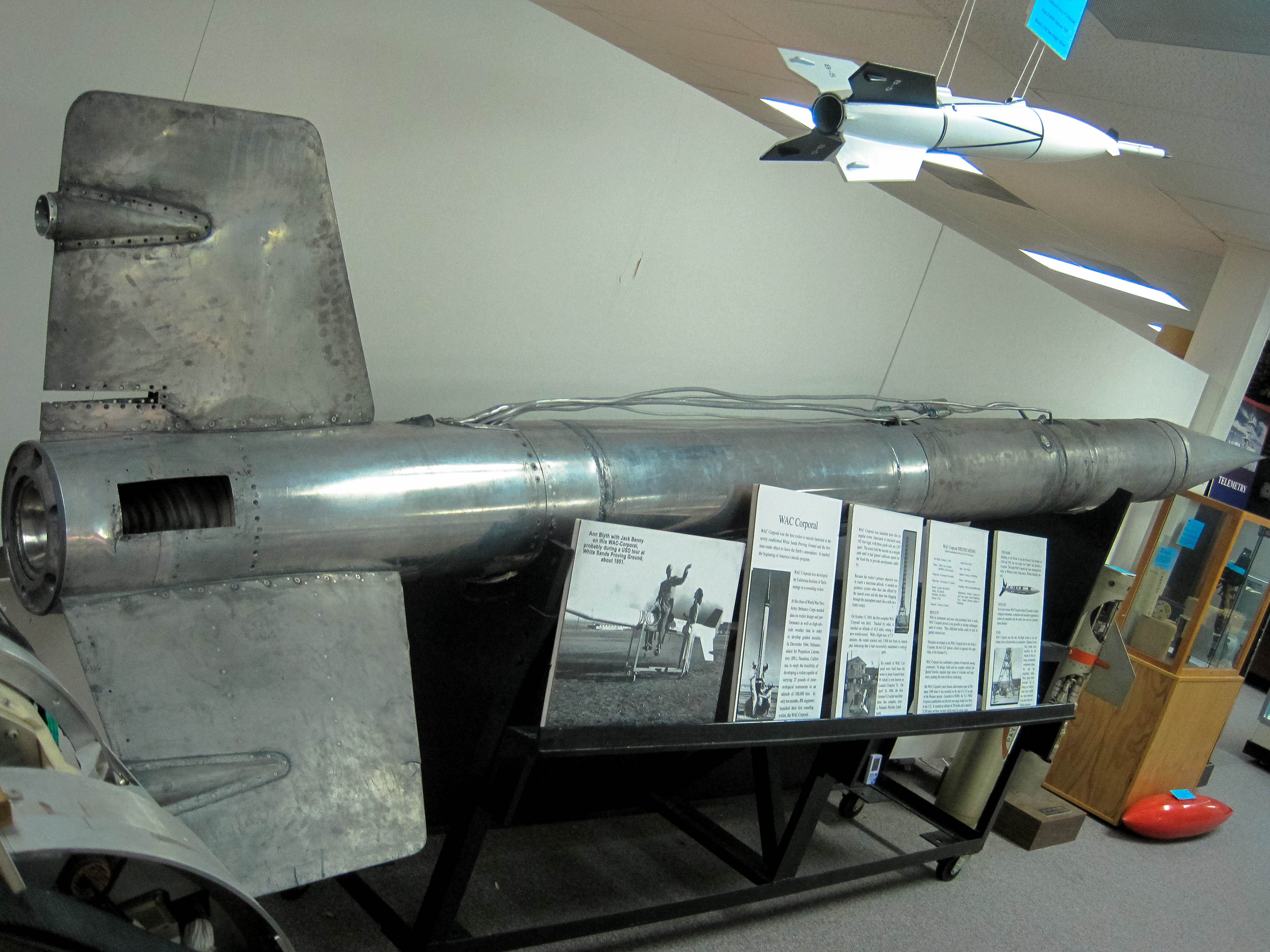
WAC Corporal on display at the White Sands Missile Range Museum

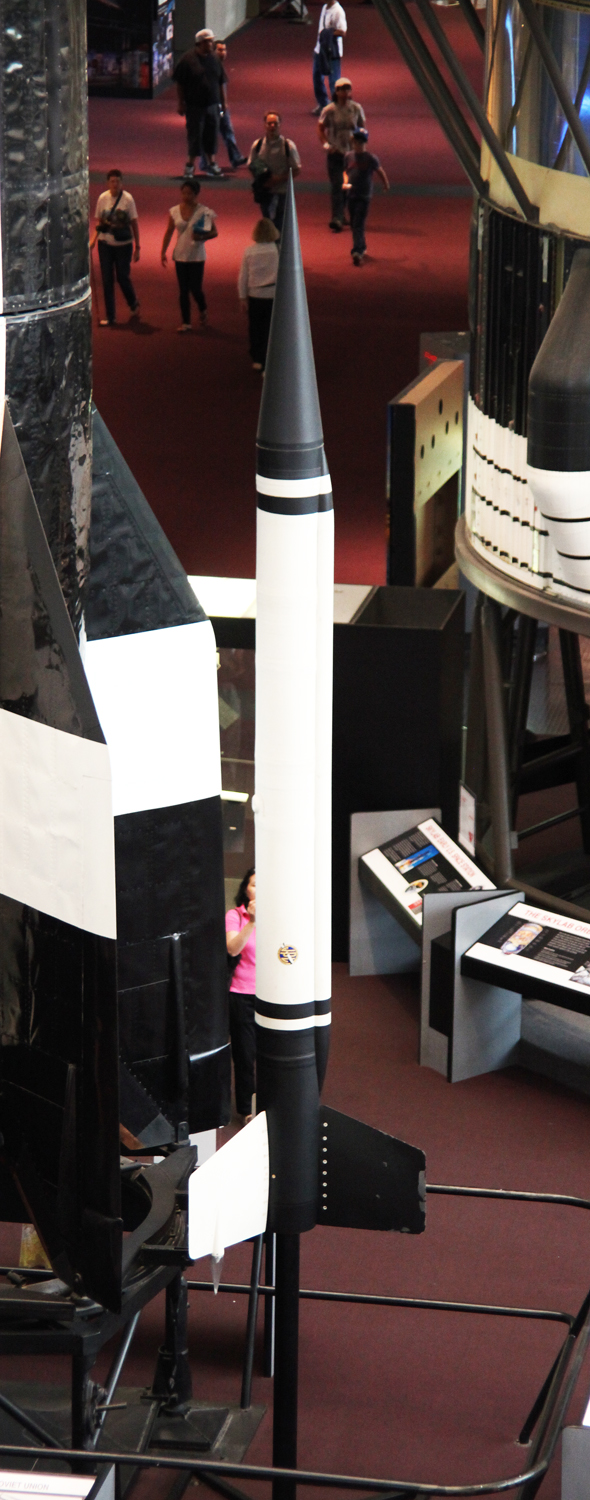
WAC Corporal on display at the National Air and Space Museum

The WAC Corporal found itself in direct competition in its designed role, with the V-2 offering much larger payload capabilities that became available in the General Electric-operated Hermes program in April 1946. It was also in competition with the Aerobee, a direct descendant of the Corporal, which was tested in late 1947 and became fully operational in spring 1948. Another competitor was the Neptune sounding rocket, later known as the Viking. The V-2 could lift 2,200 pounds (1,000 kg) to 128 miles (206 km), the Aerobee around 150 pounds (68 kg) to over 70 miles (110 km), and Viking 500 pounds (230 kg) to 100 miles (160 km). All three of these offered better performance than the Corporal's 25-pound (11 kg) payload. In terms of pounds to altitude per dollar, the Corporal also lost to the competition: Each WAC Corporal B cost US$8,000 (equivalent to $115,400 in 2025), for $320/lb to apogee, while each V-2 reassembled from captured parts cost around $30,000 ($14/lb), and the Aerobee cost $18,500 ($123/lb).

While the WAC Corporal was soon replaced in its intended role of sounding rocket, its legacy was long-lasting. Its 38ALDW-1500 engine was the direct predecessor of the Nike Ajax's A21AL-2600 and Aerobee's 45AL-2600, and was developed into the AJ10 series, which includes the AJ10-37 engine on the second stage of the world's first purpose-built satellite launch vehicle, Vanguard. Other AJ10 series members include the AJ10-101, which powered the Able upper stage on a variety of launch vehicles, the AJ10-137 Service Propulsion System on the Apollo spacecraft, and the AJ10-190 that acted as the Space Shuttle Orbital Maneuvering System. WAC Corporals are on display at the National Air and Space Museum and in the White Sands Missile Range Museum.

== Name ==
The origin of the acronym "WAC" in WAC Corporal has been claimed to stand for multiple different phrases. Some White Sands historians (Kennedy, DeVorkin, Eckles) have claimed it means "Without Attitude Control". In "Bumper 8: 50th Anniversary of the First Launch on Cape Canaveral, Group Oral History," William Pickering attributed it to "Women's Army Corps".

The earliest public reports of the WAC designation are a series of Aviation Week articles, which seem to support "Women's Army Corps" being the derivation of the acronym. In its March 18, 1946 issue, Aviation Week noted, "[u]nder the amusing security code designation of 'WAC Corporal' the project was initiated in 1944...." In the June 1, 1946 of Aviation Week, an article describes how the WAC Corporal "is launched from a triangular 100 ft. launching tower, and thereafter goes its own merry way," and claims that "[t]hese characteristics suggest some of the reasons for the female appellation of the 'WAC,' the 'Corporal' coming from the fact that some Army rockets are designated by familiar ranks."

== Specifications ==
=== Overall dimensions WAC Corporal A ===
- Diameter: 0.30 m (1 ft)
- Total length: 7.37 m (24 ft 2 in)

=== Tiny Tim booster ===
- Loaded weight: 344.4 kilograms (759.2 lb)
- Propellant weight: 67.4 kilograms (148.7 lb)
- Thrust: 220 kN (50,000 lbf)
- Duration: 0.6 s
- Impulse: 133,000 N·s (30,000 lbf·s)

=== WAC Corporal sustainer ===
- Empty weight: 134.6 kilograms (296.7 lb)
- Loaded weight: 313.3 kilograms (690.7 lb)
- Thrust: 6.7 kN (1,500 lbf)
- Duration: 47 s
- Impulse: 298,000 N·s (67,000 lbf·s)
