= MGM-5 Corporal =

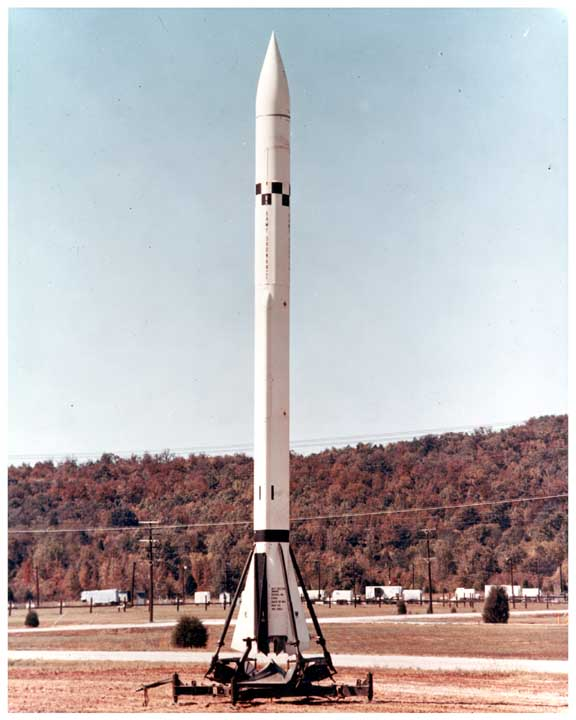
- Type: Tactical ballistic missile
- Place of origin: United States

Service history
- In service: 1954–1964
- Used by: United States Army; British Army

Production history
- Designer: Jet Propulsion Laboratory
- Designed: 1952; 74 years ago
- Manufacturer: Firestone Tire and Rubber Company
- No. built: 1,101 (55 developmental, 1,046 production)
- Variants: Type II; Type IIa; Type IIb

Specifications
- Mass: 11,000 lb (5,000 kg)
- Length: 45 ft 4 in (13.82 m)
- Diameter: 30 in (76 cm)
- Wingspan: 7 ft (2.1 m)
- Warhead: W7 nuclear
- Warhead weight: Approximately 1,000 lb (450 kg)
- Blast yield: 20 kilotons of TNT (84 TJ)
- Engine: 89 kN (20,000 lbf)
- Propellant: Liquid fuel
- Operational range: 48–130 km (30–81 mi)
- Flight ceiling: 50 km (31 mi)
- Boost time: 0:01:04
- Maximum speed: 2,400 mph (3,900 km/h; Mach 3.2)

The MGM-5 Corporal missile was an American short-range, nuclear-armed tactical surface-to-surface ballistic missile. It was the first guided weapon authorized by the United States to carry a nuclear warhead. (Note: The first nuclear-authorized unguided rocket was the MGR-1 Honest John (1953).) A guided tactical ballistic missile, the Corporal could deliver either a nuclear fission, high-explosive, fragmentation or chemical warhead up to a range of 75 nautical miles (139 km).

It was developed by the United States Army in partnership with Caltech's pioneering Jet Propulsion Laboratory, and initially produced by Douglas Aircraft Company. As development continued production shifted to Firestone Tire and Rubber Company (airframe) and Gilfillan Brothers Inc. (guidance). The Corporal was designed as a tactical nuclear missile for use in the event of Cold War hostilities in Western Europe. The first U.S. Army Corporal battalion was deployed in Europe in 1955. Eight Corporal battalions were deployed in Europe and remained in the field until 1964, when the system was replaced by the solid-fueled MGM-29 Sergeant missile system. The Corporal was the second in a series of JPL rockets for the US Army whose names correspond to the progression in Army enlisted ranks, starting with Private before ultimately leading to the MGM-29 Sergeant.

== Design and development ==
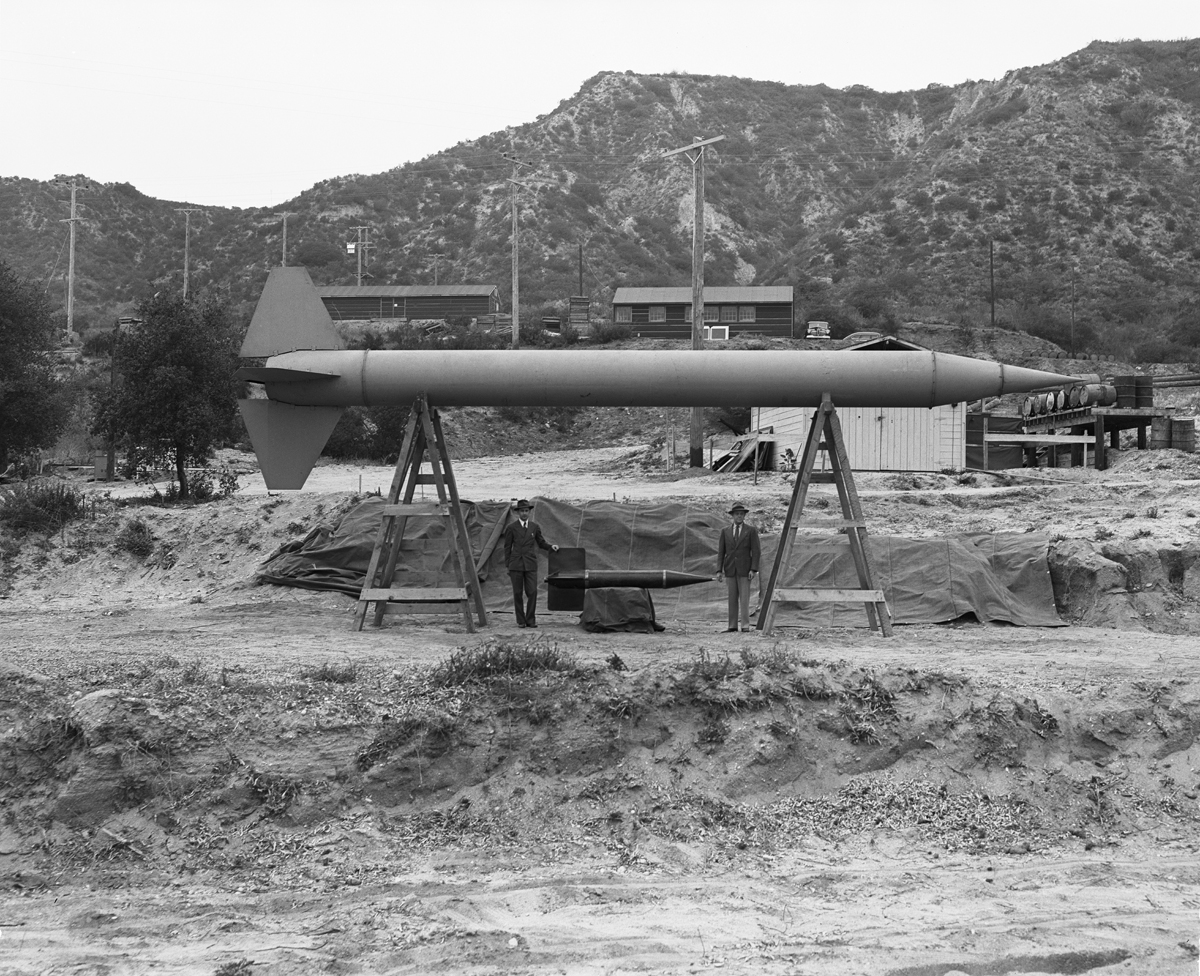
Major General Gladeon M. Barnes (right) and JPL Acting Director Frank Malina (left) stand below the 39-foot Corporal E, which was launched in May 1947.

The U.S. Army Ordnance California Institute Technology (ORDCIT) program that eventually produced the Corporal ballistic missile began in June 1944 with a contract to the Guggenheim Aeronautical Laboratories California Institute of Technology (GALCIT) to develop a ballistic guided missile. As the technology to build such a weapon did not exist in the United States it had to be created. GALCIT, later transformed into the Jet Propulsion Laboratory (JPL), began incremental efforts starting with a solid-fuel rocket program called Private. It progressed to a liquid-fuel unguided sounding rocket called WAC Corporal and a much larger guided research missile, the Corporal E. In late 1949 the Army desired to accelerate the Corporal program to create a military weapon by turning the Corporal E into a crash program and cancel the intended additional research variants. The resultant Corporal ballistic missile was developed by JPL and first flew in its weapon version at White Sands Missile Range, New Mexico, on August 7, 1952. The Corporal crash program involved utilizing as much existing equipment as it could including the WW II SCR-584 radar.

Corporal used a pressure-fed liquid-fueled rocket motor burning red fuming nitric acid (RFNA) and aniline; the exact mixture of fuel and oxidizer changed over the Corporal service period. From round 11 of the test program it became RFNA as oxidizer and a fuel consisting of 80% aniline with 20% furfuryl alcohol. As the Corporal was a crash program and constantly under development after 1958 to reduce decomposition of the RFNA and improve performance, the propellants were changed to IRFNA (inhibited red fuming nitric acid), 14% NO_{2}, 2.5% H_{2}O, 0.6% HF and 82.9% HNO_{3} oxidizer, with 46.5% aniline, 46.5% furfuryl alcohol and 7% hydrazine as fuel. this required elaborate and time-consuming preparation immediately before launch, making its tactical responsiveness questionable.

Guidance for the Corporal consisted of a complex system of internal and ground guidance. During the initial launch phase, inertial guidance kept the missile in a vertical position and pre-set guidance steered it during its launch. The ground guidance system was a modified World War II SCR-584 radar which tracked the missile's position, as well as its slant range. This information was sent to an analog computer which calculated the trajectory and any necessary correction to hit the target. A Doppler radar was used to accurately measure the missile's velocity, and this information was also used in the trajectory calculation. The Doppler radar was also used to send the final range correction and warhead arming command after the missile re-entered the atmosphere. Transponder beacons were used in the missile to provide a return signal for tracking at maximum range. The vulnerability of the Corporal system was of concern from the beginning of the weapon program. Electronic anticountermeasures were addressed over the length of the program and would have been greatly improved in Corporal III. Though a variety of warheads from high explosive and fragmentation to chemical had been developed the warhead which the missile was equipped was the W-7 (Mk.7).

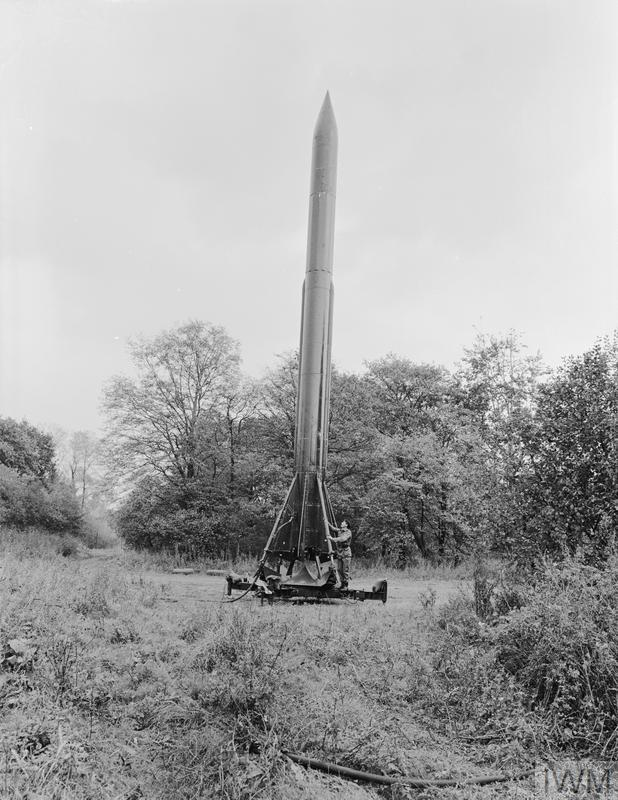
Corporal of the Royal Artillery in West Germany

A Corporal battalion was composed of 250 men requiring 35 vehicles to deploy and took nine hours to set up the missile to fire once the launch position had been reached. Corporal missile battalions in Europe were highly mobile, considering the large number of support vehicles and personnel required to support the transportation, checkout, and launch of this liquid-fueled nuclear-tipped (or conventional HE or chemical) missile. In Germany, frequent unannounced 'Alerts' were performed—necessitating assembling all personnel and moving vehicles and missiles to a pre-assigned assembly point. From there the battalion would move to a launch site—usually somewhere in a remote forest—set up the missile on its launcher and go through a detailed checkout of the various systems. This was not a trivial operation as these electronic systems were largely vacuum tubes. A mock firing would be performed and the entire battalion would be gone as soon as possible in order to not be a target of counter-battery fire.

For what was the first nuclear armed missile the Corporal I was significantly unreliable and inaccurate. The continuing development of the Corporal weapon system led rapidly to the development of the Corporal II. This was initiated while the Corporal I was still under development. Though Corporal I was deemed operable many shortcomings in both the missile and ground equipment tactical usability had become obvious during development. Engineer-User trials had shown that the primary reason for mechanical and electrical causes arose because the systems of the Corporal I were too delicate. Problems detected in the E-U trials were addressed in the Corporal II. The Type II Corporal was subsequently improved in the Corporal IIa and IIb (M2A1) versions. The first Corporal II prototype was flown on October 8, 1953. The first complete Type II system was delivered in February 1955, The Type II Corporal greatly improved the accuracy and reliability of the missile system. When compared to other early missiles the final production Corporal II was reasonably accurate. Still the aggregate accuracy of all Type IIs with a CEP (Circular Error Probable) of 350 meters which was still short of the desired 300 meters. The role of JPL was greatly reduced in 1955–56.

"The Corporal Story" (1955) Official de-classified U.S. Army information film reel.

The deficiencies of the Corporal II led to the design and development of Corporal III. The objectives of Corporal III were to produce a much improved weapon system with improved reliability, ground support equipment, and especially ground guidance equipment, to provide the Army with a fully developed weapon. Only small changes to the Corporal IIb missile would be required. In 1956 all research and development work on the Corporal II had been completed. A study at Redstone Arsenal noted that the MGM-29 Sergeant missile system would become available for service in 1963 and that Corporal III equipment should only be procured for additional Corporal units. Though a Type III Corporal was flown in 1957 it was too late for the eternally developing Corporal system. On May 23, 1957 all work on the Corporal III was ended to conserve funds for Sergeant following defense budget cuts. In 1963 the solid-fueled Sergeant missiles with self-contained inertial guidance systems which was jamming proof, and which took only an hour from occupying the site to launch of the missile, started replacing the Corporal IIb in Europe. By June 1964 the Corporal system was history in American service. In June 1966 the last Corporal unit, the 27th Guided Weapons Regiment Royal Artillery, retired its Corporals.

== Introduction to service ==
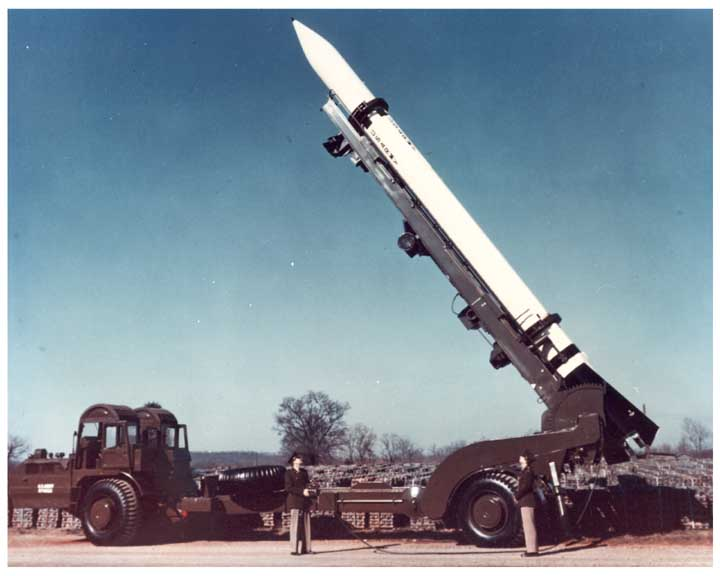
MGM-5 on an erector-and-launcher.

The first three Corporal battalions were activated in March 1952 with an Engineer-User launch program beginning in January 1953. In the same year the Corporal II system was sold to the United Kingdom. The extremely ambitious original goal of the Corporal program was to have 16 battalions of missiles deployed by July 1954. Two batteries of Corporal I had been organized and equipped by July 1954. The 259th Corporal Battalion deployed to Europe in February 1955. It was followed by other units and by 1960 there were six battalions in Germany, two in Italy and four in the United States. Live-fire training for Germany-based US forces took place at Fort Bliss but later the British Royal Artillery Guided Weapons Range on the Scottish island of South Uist in the Outer Hebrides was used. Missiles were fired toward designated target coordinates in the Atlantic Ocean. Radar on Hirta (the main island of the St Kilda archipelago of Scotland) identified missile landing points. Frequently, Soviet spy ship 'fishing trawlers' would intrude into the target area. The UK adoption of the Corporal resulted in the islet of Rockall being incorporated into the United Kingdom in 1955, the last addition to the UK, to prevent its use by Soviet observers: the UK Minister of Defence Harold Macmillan was concerned that, were they to do so, the Soviets might discover how to jam Corporal guidance and tracking radio signals.

== Operators ==
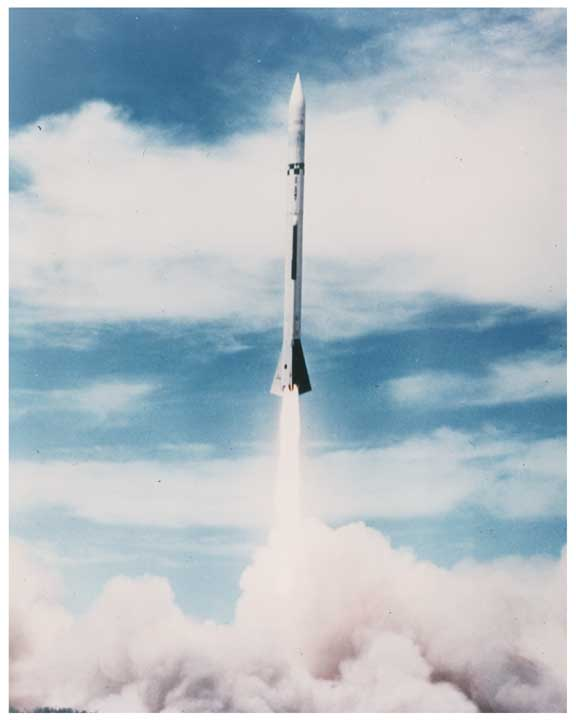
MGM-5 in flight.

United Kingdom

- British Army, Royal Artillery
  - 27th Guided Weapons Regiment RA 1957–1966
  - 47th Guided Weapons Regiment RA 1957–1965

United States

- United States Army
  - 246th Missile Battalion (reflagged as 2nd Battalion 80th Field Artillery Regiment (Fort Sill))
  - 259th Missile Battalion (reflagged as 1st Battalion 40th Field Artillery Regiment (Fort Bliss))
  - 523rd Missile Battalion (reflagged as 1st Battalion 81st Field Artillery Regiment (Fort Carson))
  - 526th Missile Battalion (reflagged as 1st Battalion 84th Field Artillery Regiment (Fort Sill))
  - 530th Missile Battalion (reflagged as 1st Battalion 39th Field Artillery Regiment (Germany))
  - 531st Missile Battalion (reflagged as 1st Battalion 38th Field Artillery Regiment (Germany))
  - 543rd Missile Battalion (reflagged as 1st Battalion 82nd Field Artillery Regiment (Italy))
  - 557th Missile Battalion (reflagged as 2nd Battalion 81st Field Artillery Regiment (Germany))
  - 558th Missile Battalion (reflagged as 1st Battalion 82nd Field Artillery Regiment (Germany))
  - 559th Missile Battalion (reflagged as 2nd Battalion 84th Field Artillery Regiment (Germany))
  - 570th Missile Battalion (reflagged as 1st Battalion 80th Field Artillery Regiment (Italy))
  - 601st Missile Battalion (reflagged as 2nd Battalion 40th Field Artillery Regiment (Germany))

== See also ==
- Corporal E
- List of U.S. Army weapons by supply catalog designation (SNL Y-3)
- Frank Malina
- Private (missile)
- WAC Corporal
- MGM-29 Sergeant
- List of U.S. Army Rocket Launchers by model number
- Blue Water (missile), cancelled UK replacement for Corporal
