= 80th Field Artillery Regiment =

US military unit

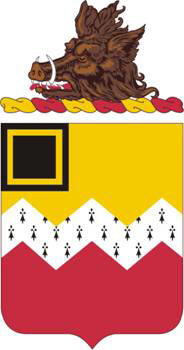
- Coat of arms
- Country: United States
- Branch: Army
- Type: Field artillery
- Motto(s): TOUJOURS L’AUDACE

Insignia
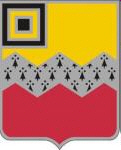
- Distinctive Unit Insignia

The 80th Field Artillery Regiment is a field artillery regiment of the United States Army. It is part of the Field Artillery Branch.

== 2nd Battalion ==
The 2nd Battalion, 80th Field Artillery was constituted on 1 July 1916 in the Regular Army as Troops C and D, 22nd Cavalry. It was reorganized on 21 June 1917 at Fort Oglethorpe, Georgia and then consolidated, converted, and redesignated on 1 November 1917 as Battery B, 80th Field Artillery. On 10 September 1921, it was inactivated at Camp George G. Meade, Maryland.

On 12 October 1939, the battery was activated at Fort Lewis, Washington. On 1 October 1940, the 2-80 FA was reorganized and redesignated as Battery B, 80th Field Artillery Battalion. On 20 July 1947, it was inactivated in Korea. It was reactivated on 4 October 1950 at Fort Ord, California, where it was later inactivated on 3 April 1956. On 2 June 1958, 2-80 FA was redesignated as Headquarters and Headquarters Battery, 2nd Missile Battalion, 80th Field Artillery. The battalion activated 25 June 1958 at Fort Sill, Oklahoma, where it later inactivated on 25 March 1963. In September 1971, it was redesignated as the 2nd Missile Battalion, 80th Field Artillery. On 28 February 1987, the 2-80 FA was reorganized and activated as the 2nd Battalion, 80th Field Artillery, consisting of three Basic Training and two Advanced Individual Training Batteries. Later it was reorganized to consist of four Army and one Marine Field Artillery Advanced Individual Training batteries. It became part of the Field Artillery Training Center.

"In ..2004 the 2nd Battalion, 80th Field Artillery, the brigade’s AIT battalion, was inactivated and the 1-78 FA, the support battalion, was designated the AIT battalion and assigned to the 30th FA Regiment (now the 428th FA Brigade)."

== Training accident ==
On September 27, 1989, eighty soldiers of Alpha Battery of the 2nd Battalion, 80th Field Artillery Regiment, were standing in formation when one or more shells apparently over-shot the intended target on a firing range and landed among them. Three soldiers were killed and 24 were injured. Two soldiers were charged with negligent homicide and dereliction of duty, but were later cleared as it was determined there was no criminal intent.

== Distinctive unit insignia ==
- Description

A Silver color metal and enamel device 1 3/32 inches (2.8 cm) in height overall consisting of a shield blazoned: Party per fess Or and Gules, a fess dancetté ermine. On a canton Sable an orle of the first (from the coat of arms of the 11th Cavalry).

- Symbolism

The dual character of the regiment is shown by the colors of the field, yellow for cavalry, red for artillery. The fess dancetté is taken from the arms of the Oglethorpe family, also the boar's head crest, which in addition is the ancient symbol of hospitality. The arms of ancient Brittany was a shield of ermine, and ermine figures prominently in the arms of Vannes; this is shown by the tincture of the fess. The parent organization is shown on the canton.

- Background

The distinctive unit insignia was originally approved for the 80th Field Artillery Regiment on 14 November 1932. It was redesignated for the 80th Field Artillery Battalion on 5 December 1942. It was redesignated for the 80th Artillery Regiment on 21 November 1958. The insignia was redesignated effective 1 September 1971, for the 80th Field Artillery Regiment.

== Coat of arms ==
- Blazon
  - Shield- Party per fess Or and Gules, a fess dancetté ermine. On a canton Sable an orle of the first (from the coat of arms of the 11th Cavalry).
  - Crest- On a wreath of the colors Or and Gules, a boar's head Proper.
  - Motto- TOUJOURS L’AUDACE (Always Brave)
- Symbolism- The dual character of the regiment is shown by the colors of the field, yellow for cavalry, red for artillery. World War I service is indicated by the fess which is based on the arms of ancient Brittany and the arms of Vannes where the unit served. The fess dancetté is taken from the arms of the Oglethorpe family, also the boar's head crest, which in addition is the ancient symbol of hospitality. The arms of ancient Brittany was a shield of ermine, and ermine figures prominently in the arms of Vannes; this is shown by the tincture of the fess. The Canton refers to the coat of army of the 11th Cavalry, from which the men were transferred to form the 22nd Cavalry, predecessor of the present regiment. The boar's head, from the arms of the Oglethorpe family, closely identified with Georgia, the state in which the unit was organized is an ancient symbol of hospitality.
- Background- The coat of arms was originally approved for the 80th Field Artillery Regiment on 24 March 1920. It was amended to correct the motto on 20 September 1921. It was redesignated for the 80th Field Artillery Battalion on 5 December 1942. It was redesignated for the 80th Artillery Regiment on 21 November 1958. The insignia was redesignated effective 1 September 1971, for the 80th Field Artillery Regiment.
