= MGM-29 Sergeant =

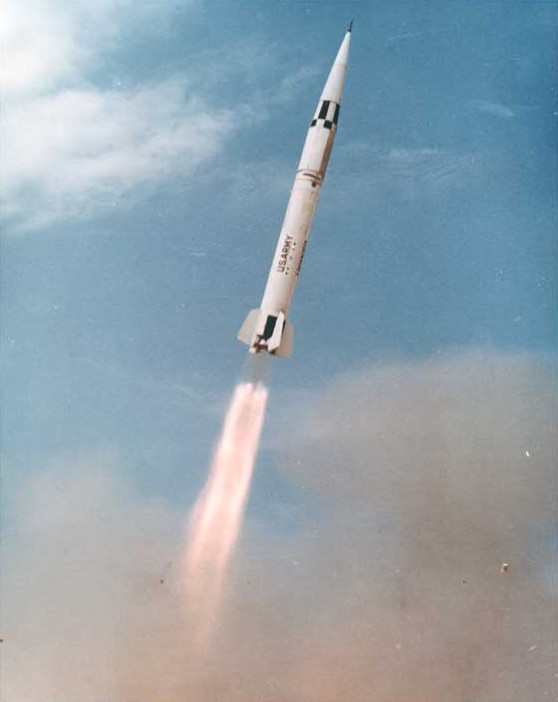
- MGM-29A
- Type: Tactical ballistic missile
- Place of origin: United States

Service history
- In service: 1962–1979
- Used by: United States Army; German Army

Production history
- Designer: Jet Propulsion Laboratory
- Designed: 1955
- Manufacturer: Sperry Utah
- No. built: ~500

Specifications
- Mass: 10,100 lb (4,600 kg)
- Length: 34 ft 6 in (10.52 m)
- Diameter: 31 in (79 cm)
- Warhead: W52 (M65) nuclear
- Blast yield: 200 kilotons of TNT (840 TJ)
- Engine: Thiokol XM100; 200 kN (45,000 lbf)
- Propellant: Solid fuel
- Operational range: 75 nmi (139 km)
- Boost time: 34 sec
- Guidance system: Inertial

The MGM-29 Sergeant was an American short-range, solid fuel, surface-to-surface missile developed by the Jet Propulsion Laboratory (JPL). The missiles were built by Sperry Utah Company. The Sergeant was the third and last in a series of JPL rockets for the US Army whose names correspond to the progression in Army enlisted ranks, starting with Private and Corporal.

The Sergeant missile was first fired by an operational field artillery unit at White Sands, New Mexico by the 3rd Battalion 38th Artillery station from Fort Sill, Oklahoma in the summer of 1962. President John F. Kennedy attended the fire power demonstration at White Sands New Mexico.

== Development ==
The Sergeant originated during 1948 at JPL. Due to the large workload of the Corporal missile program, rocket motor development for the Sergeant was transferred to the Redstone Division of the Thiokol Corporation. Due to the failure of the Sergeant program to develop rapidly the early Sergeant was terminated in April 1951. Another Army missile program, the Hermes program had developed the Hermes A2 another solid fueled missile. The Hermes RV-A-10 (A2) was successful but not pursued with the motor serving as the inspiration for future solid rocket motors. JPL cautioned against making Sergeant a "crash" program as with Corporal.

Sergeant missile development began January 1955. There were three basic steps planned: feasibility demonstration in 1955–1957, experimental development in 1958 and 1959, followed by final engineering in 1960 and 1961. The rocket motor was designed by JPL and built by Thiokol. Picatinny Arsenal was to supply the warhead and adapter. Ground Support equipment and vehicles were to be the responsibility of JPL. By fall 1956 it was decided to defer procurement of the Corporal III to development of the much more practical Sergeant. Flight tests began in early 1956 resulting in significant design changes, By July 1961 the Sergeant weapon system had numerous deficiencies including check out, repair ease, standby readiness, reliability and low temperature storage limits. Sergeant was to be ready on time but fell miserably short of meeting the goal of being the weapon originally envisioned. When compared to its predecessor, the Sergeant required less than 33% of the ground support equipment, and could be fired within minutes rather than hours after arriving at the firing location. Sergeant was relatively simple to operate and maintain. The Sergeant was to carry the W52 (M65) nuclear warhead. The Sergeant had been considered for deployment with high explosive, fragmentation, biological and chemical warheads. A biological warhead, the M210 and a chemical warhead, the M212 were approved but never procured.

== In service ==
"Weapons of the Field Artillery" (1966)

Activated by the US Army in 1962 to replace the MGM-5 Corporal, it was deployed in Europe and South Korea by 1963, and to German units by 1964.

The Sergeant weapon system was to be replaced by the MGM-52 Lance in the early 1970s but delays in the Lance caused it to remain in service. The last US Army battalion was deactivated in 1977. Sergeant Missile Systems were usually assigned to the field army with the mission of "general support to a corps."

Operation of the Sergeant was recognized to be an interim stage in the development of battlefield missiles. It avoided the Corporal's liquid-fuel-handling drawbacks, but still requiring extensive setup and checkout before launch, together with a train of semi-trailer support vehicles. More advanced missiles, such as the contemporary Blue Water and later Lance, would reduce setup time.

The Sergeant had a takeoff thrust of 200 kilonewtons (45,000 lb_{f}), a takeoff weight of 4,530 kilograms (9,990 lb), a diameter of 790 millimetres (31 in), a length of 10.52 metres (34.5 ft) and a fin span of 1.80 metres (5 ft 11 in). The Sergeant missile had a minimum range of 40 kilometres (25 mi), and a maximum range of 135 kilometres (84 mi). Thiokol developed the Sergeant rocket motors, and the Castor rocket stages derived from them, at the Redstone Arsenal near Huntsville, Alabama.

=== Derivatives ===
The Castor rocket stage, a Sergeant derivative, was used as the second stage of the Scout satellite launcher, and later as part of the first stage of some Little Joe rockets. The Pollux motor was also a derivative of the Sergeant, and also saw use on the Little Joe, along with other sounding rockets. Clusters of Sergeant-derived rockets (the "Baby Sergeant") were used in the second and third stages of the Jupiter-C sounding rocket, as well as in the second, third, and fourth stages of the Juno I and Juno II launch vehicles, the former of which launched the first United States satellite, Explorer 1.

== Operators ==
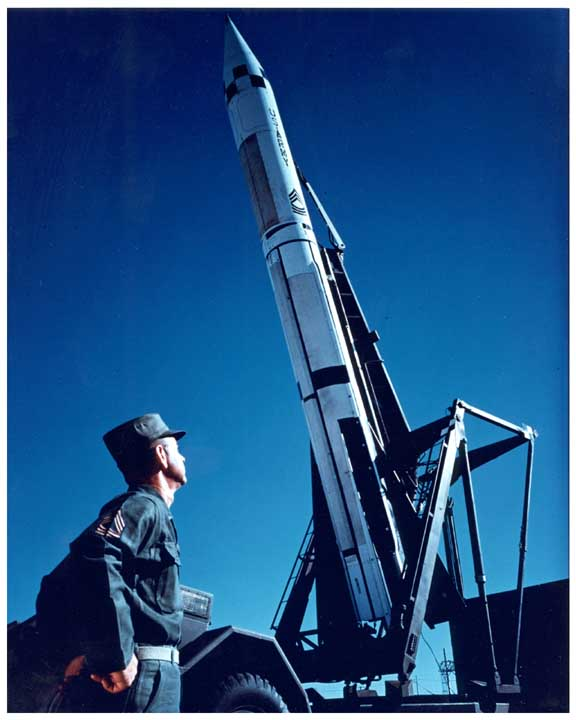
MGM-29 on test-launch stand.

West Germany German Army

- 150th Rocket Artillery Battalion (1964–1976)
- 250th Rocket Artillery Battalion (1964–1976)
- 350th Rocket Artillery Battalion (1964–1976)
- 650th Rocket Artillery Battalion (1965–1976)

United States United States Army

- 5th Battalion, 30th Field Artillery Regiment (1963–1972) - Vicenza, Italy
- 3rd Battalion, 38th Field Artillery Regiment (1962–1974) - Fort Sill
- 1st Battalion, 68th Field Artillery Regiment (1964–1970) - West Germany
- 5th Battalion, 73rd Field Artillery Regiment (1963–1973) - West Germany
- 5th Battalion, 77th Field Artillery Regiment (1963–1973) - West Germany
- 3rd Battalion, 80th Field Artillery Regiment (1964–1970) - West Germany
- 3rd Battalion, 81st Field Artillery Regiment (1963–1977) - South Korea

== Gallery ==
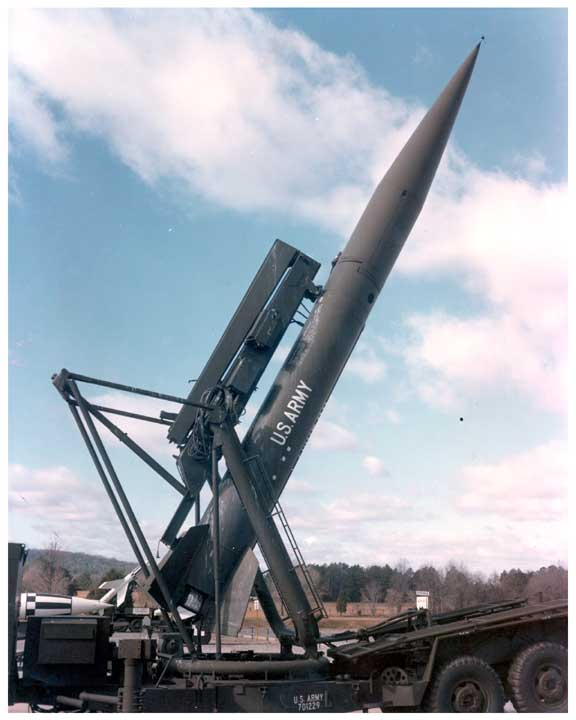
MGM-29 aboard an Army erector-and-launcher.

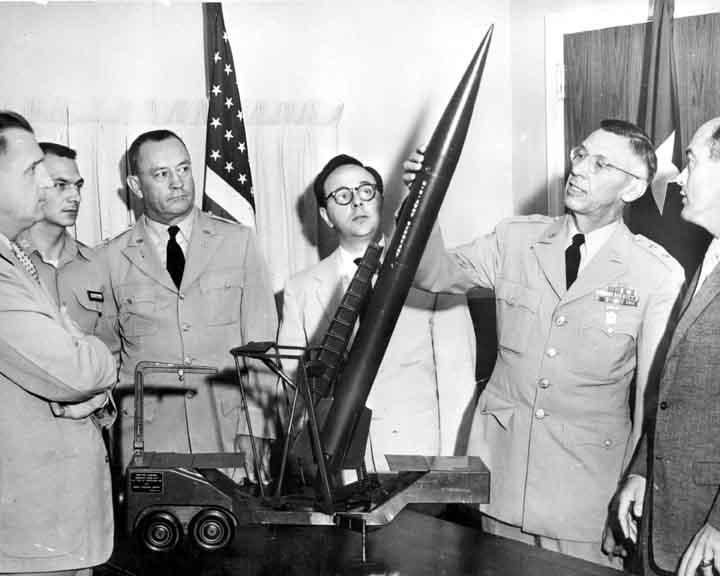
U.S. Army Major General Holger N. Toftoy examining a model of the Sergeant missile.
