= Judy Malloy =

American writer and visual artist

- Born: Judith Ann Powers; January 9, 1942 (age 84); Boston, Massachusetts
- Education: Middlebury College
- Children: Sean Langdon Malloy
- Parent(s): Barbara Lillard Powers; Wilbur Langdon "Ike" Powers
- Relatives: Walter Powers (cousin)
- Website: Well.com user page

Judy Malloy (born Judith Ann Powers; January 9, 1942) is an American poet whose works embrace the intersection of hypernarrative, magic realism, and information art. Beginning with Uncle Roger in 1986, Malloy has composed works in both new media literature and hypertext fiction. She was an early creator of online interactive and collaborative fiction on The WELL and the website ArtsWire.

Malloy has served as editor and leader for books and web projects. Her literary works have been exhibited worldwide. Recently she has been a Digital Studies Fellow at the Rutgers Camden Digital Studies Center (2016-2017) and a Visiting Lecturer at Princeton University in Social Media Poetics (2013) and Electronic Literature (2014).

== Biography ==
=== Early life and education ===
Born in Boston a month after the attack on Pearl Harbor, Malloy was raised in Massachusetts. Her mother was a journalist and newspaper editor, and her father, a Normandy veteran, worked as an assistant district attorney in two Massachusetts counties and then as Chief Assistant US Attorney for Massachusetts. Malloy skied and played tennis, summering in New Hampshire, Cape Cod, and the Berkshires. Malloy felt an early calling to the visual arts and began painting and sketching as a child.

=== Career ===
After graduating from Middlebury College with a degree in literature and work in studio art and art history, Malloy took a job at the Library of Congress; she also traveled in Europe. In the next few years, while writing and making art, Malloy worked as a technical information specialist at the NASA contractor Ball Brothers Research Corporation, running their technical library and learning FORTRAN programming in order to identify relevant content for research. Malloy moved to the East Bay in the mid 1970s and lived in Berkeley where, in addition to installations and performances, she developed a series of artist's books that incorporated non-sequential narratives driven by words and images.

Her papers are currently being collected by the David M. Rubenstein Rare Book & Manuscript Library at Duke University.

== Hypertexts and electronic literature ==
Judy Malloy has written electronic literature works for over three decades.

In 1986, Malloy wrote and programmed Uncle Roger, the first online hyperfiction project with links that took the narrative in different directions depending on the reader's choice. This work was programmed in BASIC as a serial novel from 1986-1987, sold on floppy disks from 1987-1988 from Art Com Catalog and published on the web in 1995. The Wall Street Journal mentioned Uncle Roger as the start of a future art form in their 1989 centennial publication. Uncle Roger was a three-part hypertextual "narrabase" (narrative database) that used keyword searching (including Boolean operators) and appeared on Art Com Electronic Network on the WELL. In 1995, Malloy moved this and other "narrabase" projects to the Web.

Malloy's hyperfiction work its name was Penelope was exhibited in 1989 at the Richmond Art Center and published in 1993 by Eastgate Systems. This work has been reconstructed "emulated" by The NEXT Museum, Library, and Preservation Space.

Also in 1993, Malloy was invited to XEROX PARC as an artist-in-residence, where she developed Brown House Kitchen, an online narrative written in LambdaMOO. Malloy then wrote l0ve0ne, published in 1994 by Eastgate Web Workshop as their first work. Malloy created Making Art Online] in 1994. One of the first arts websites, Making Art Online is currently hosted by the Walker Art Center.

The Yellow Bowl was an early hypertext in BASIC in 1992 which has been reconfigured to be accessible on the modern Web. It contains about 800 nodes and has three narratives centering around Grace who is writing two fiction stories about women escaping oppressive environments.

Forward/Anywhere: Notes on an Exchange between Intersecting Lives. Between 1993 and 1996, while working with PARC, Malloy and Cathy Marshall (hypertext developer) collaborated on this work, which was a hypernarrative based on emails between them in which they sought "to exchange the remembered and day-to-day substance of our lives". They wrote an article, "Closure Was Never a Goal in this Piece", in the book Wired Women which documented their experiences working on this project. Malloy wrote of this project that it was aa response to Xerox PARC's artist-in-residence program. This early work experimented with reader interaction, with "Forward" using hypertext links and Anywhere using a random number generator to present pieces in a random order.Women, Art, and Technology

Other Hypertext fiction includes

lOveOne, 1994

The Roar of Destiny, 1997

Dorothy Abrona McCrae, 2000

A Party at Silver Beach (2003; 2012)

Spring Day Notation, 2010

Emanated from the Refrigerator

== Editing and writing ==
In 1988, Malloy became the coordinating editor of FineArt Forum, under the Leonardo publishing umbrella, and developed F. A. S. T. (Fine Art Science and Technology), a resource on the Whole Earth 'Lectronic Link (The WELL) bulletin board. Malloy was the initial editor of Leonardo Electronic News, 1991–1993, now Leonardo Electronic Almanac. For Leonardo, she worked to make the work of new media artists more visible, creating the artists' "Words on Works" (WOW) Project, published in Leonardo Electronic News and Leonardo.

Malloy worked for Arts Wire, a program of the New York Foundation for the Arts (NYFA) from its early origins in 1993. She began serving as editor of the online periodical Arts Wire Current in March 1996. She continued as editor through the periodical's name change to NYFA Current in November, 2002, until March 2004.

Malloy edited Women, Art & Technology (MIT Press, 2003), as part of the Leonardo book series documentation of the central role of female artists in the development of new media. The book lays out a historical outline of the female influence in art and technology including papers written by notable members of the field. She is also the editor of content | code | process (formerly called Authoring Software), a website of resources related to the authoring tools used for hypertext and other forms of database-driven writing. Her most recent work is the 2010 new media poetry trilogy Paths of Memory and Painting, the first part of which appeared in 2008 under the title where every luminous landscape.

Malloy edited the July 2016 MIT Press book, Social Media Archeology and Poetics. Chapter 31. A Way Is Open: Allusion, Authoring System, Identity, and Audience in Early Text-Based Electronic Literature As she describes this work, "Social Media Archeology and Poetics is media archeology about how social media platforms with cultural components were developed and flourished in the days before the World Wide Web."

== Exhibitions ==
Her work has been exhibited and published internationally including the 2008 Electronic Literature Conference, San Francisco Art Institute, Tisch School of the Arts, New York University, São Paulo Art Biennial, the Los Angeles Institute for Contemporary Art, Boston Cyberarts Festival, the Walker Art Center, Visual Studies Workshop, Berkeley Art Center, Finger Lakes Environmental Film Festival, Centenary of Carmen Conde, Cartagena, Spain, Istanbul Contemporary Art Museum and the Hellenic American Union in Athens, Houston Center for Photography, Richmond Art Center, San Antonio Art Institute, A Space, Toronto, Canada, National Library of Madrid, Eastgate Systems, E. P. Dutton, Tanam Press, Seal Press, MIT Press, The Iowa Review Web, and Blue Moon Review. Malloy's where every luminous landscape (2008) was exhibited at The Future of Writing, University of California, Irvine, November, 2008 and the E-Poetry Festival, Barcelona, May, 2009. In May 2009 it was a finalist in the prix poésie-média 2009 hosted by the Biennale Internationale des poetes (BIPVAL) in Val de Marne, France.

== Selected works ==
- Artists Books (1977–1993)
- Landscape Projects (1978–)
- Installations (1979–1995)
- Bad Thad. Dutton. 1980. ISBN 978-0-525-26148-3.
- Uncle Roger (1986–1987) (2003 revised edition)
- Bad Information (1986–1988)
- OK Research and OK Genetic Engineering (1988)
- YOU! (1991), online poem with multiple contributors, programmed and produced by Judy Malloy
- Wasting Time, A Narrative Data Structure (1992)
- its name was Penelope (1993)
- l0ve0ne (1994)
- name is scibe (1994) a collaboratively created hyperfiction by Judy Malloy, Tom Igoe, Chris Abraham, Tim Collins, Anna Couey, Valerie Gardiner, Joseph Wilson and Doug Cohen
- The Roar of Destiny Emanated From the Refrigerator (1995–1999) an epic hyperpoem
- Forward Anywhere (1995), a collaborative hyperfiction by Judy Malloy and Cathy Marshall
- Dorothy Abrona McCrae (2000)
- Interlude — Dorothy and Sid (2001)
- A Party At Silver Beach (2002)
- Afterwards (2003)
- Judy Malloy, ed. (October 2003). Women, Art, and Technology. Leonardo Books. MIT Press. ISBN 978-0-262-13424-8.
- Revelations of Secret Surveillance (2004–2007)
- Concerto for Narrative Data (2005–2006, 2008)
- The Wedding Celebration of Gunter and Gwen (2006–2007)
- Paths of Memory and Painting (2010)
- "'A WAY IS OPEN', Allusion, Identity, Authoring System, and Audience in Early Text-Based Electronic Literature" for Contexts, Forms, and Practices of Electronic Literature. edited by Dene Grigar and James O'Sullivan, West Virginia University Press, 2017

== Awards ==
Malloy was shortlisted for the 2017 Hayles Prize Social Media Archeology and Poetics, MIT Press, 2016.

== See also ==
- List of electronic literature authors, critics, and works
- Digital poetry
- E-book#History
- Electronic literature
- Hypertext fiction
- Interactive fiction
- Literatronica
