= Space propaganda =

Propaganda about space exploration and science

Space propaganda is a form of propaganda relating to achievements in space exploration and space science. It is used primarily to further a nation's perceived technological superiority, through the operation of a state-funded space agency. Space propaganda was first emergent during the Space Race of the mid-20th-century, an indirect extension of the Cold War.

Although primarily associated with nationalistic pursuits, space propaganda has also been used to promote international organizations and collaborative space efforts.

== Space race ==
During the Cold War, both the United States and the Soviet Union engaged in extensive political warfare in an attempt to promote contrasting political ideologies. This manifested in demonstrations of technological superiority, complementary with exceptionalist Cold War ideology.
Space propaganda during the Space Race also appealed to a sense of strategic and military advantage. Due to the large amount of potential military applications to innovations in space science, such as rocket technology and the development of ballistic missiles in the wake of the nuclear arms race, fearmongering is common in space propaganda of this period.

=== Examples ===
Many forms of space propaganda have been used by public and government officials to influence space policy. Because that very few people have been to space, propaganda often relied on artistic depictions and imagery to convey its messages.

==== Sputnik Crisis ====
The successful launch of Sputnik in 1957 undermined the belief of American technological superiority. This event showed that the Soviets were ahead of the Americans. This Soviet achievement put pressure on U.S. President Dwight D. Eisenhower and was looked on by many as his greatest failure. According to McDougall, "The concomitant arrival of Sputnik and the Third World generalized the problem of the American image. The Soviet challenge and European colonial heritage made it vital for the United States to present and image of progressive anticolonialism."

==== Yuri Gagarin ====
Yuri Gagarin was the first man in space. This was a monumental event not only in Soviet history but also world history. His achievements made him a celebrity and he was perceived as an international hero. He had a common background, his wife recalling a story about a time he was thrown out of a house and had to live in a dugout of a garden for three years during the German occupation of the Soviet Union. As his popularity soared, it also became threatening. President Kennedy did not let Yuri Gagarin tour the United States. Yuri Gagarin's story was told to millions of people throughout the world. Books, magazines, TV shows, movies have been made to honor this man. Posters and stamps were issued with Yuri's face on it. April 12 is known as the Day of Space in Russia to commemorate Yuri Gagarin's flight.

In the Soviet Union, being the first to reach space was seen as a great victory. Yuri Gagarin's 1961 flight into space was seen by many as another Sputnik moment. Khrushchev stated that Gagarin's flight was the "...greatest triumph of the immortal Lenin's ideas." Egypt's President Nasser stated the "gigantic scientific capabilities of the Soviet people and had no doubt that the launching of man into space will turn upside down not only many scientific views, but also many political and military trends". American newspapers characterized Soviet advancement as: "a psychological victory of the first magnitude"; "new evidence of Soviet superiority"; "cost the nation heavily in prestige"; "marred the political and psychological image of the country abroad"; "Neutral nations may come to believe the wave of the future is Russian."

==== Gherman Titov ====
Gherman Titov's flight into space, being the second human to orbit Earth, was seen as a major accomplishment not only for the Soviet Union as a whole but the Premier himself and was boasted about in Pravda which stated that the Premier, "directs the development of the major technical projects in the country, and determines the basic directions of planned growth in cosmic science and technology. In his able proposals there is evidence again and again of his great conviction in the triumph of Soviet rocket technology." Khrushchev felt pressure to put money into missiles and space technology but diverted much of it towards self-serving political objectives.

==== Valentina Tereshkova ====
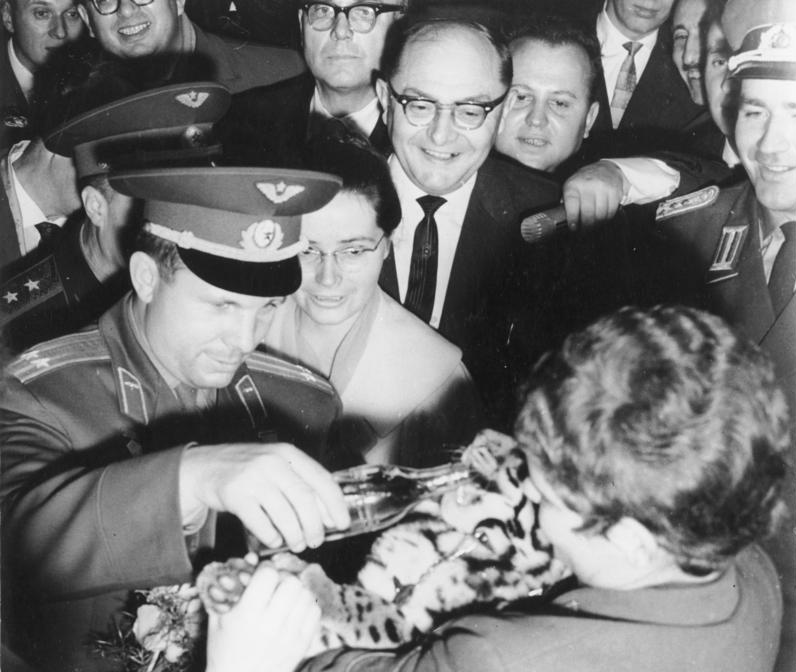
Yuri Gagarin and Valentina Tereshkova baptizing a baby tiger at Tierpark Berlin

The USSR launched the first woman (also the first civilian), Valentina Tereshkova, into space on Vostok 6; this was a propaganda stunt rather than a good faith step for women's equality, and possibly a medical experiment. Prior to flying on Vostok 6, Tereshkova worked in a textile factory and was an amateur parachutist. After Gagarin's flight, Nikolai Kamanin, director of cosmonaut training, read in American media about the "Mercury 13", female pilots trying to become astronauts. Although this article noted that the women passed the same medical qualification tests as the male candidates, it must not have mentioned that they were not accepted or trained as astronauts by NASA, and thus had absolutely no chance of being accepted into the all-male test pilot-astronaut community. In his diary, Kamanin wrote, "We cannot allow that the first woman in space will be American. This would be an insult to the patriotic feelings of Soviet women." He got permission to choose a small corps of female cosmonauts; Tereshkova was the only one of five women amateur parachutists to fly.

Although she had to join the Soviet Air Forces to become a cosmonaut, Soviet male test pilots of the 1960s were no more accepting of women in their ranks than their American counterparts, though the Soviet Air Force had three segregated all-women combat air regiments in World War II. On November 3, 1963, Tereshkova married Vostok 3 cosmonaut Andriyan Nikolayev, and they had a daughter, Elena Andrianovna Nikolaeva-Tereshkova, the first person with both a mother and father who had traveled into space.

Kamanin wanted to fly more women on the last two Voskhod flights, but the cancellation of these flights in 1965 put an end to this. The USSR didn't again open its cosmonaut corps to women until 1980, two years after the United States opened its astronaut corps to women.

==== Voshkod 1 ====
When the Soviet Union launched Voskhod 1, the first spacecraft to carry 3 people, Pravda's headline read, "Sorry Apollo!". The article continued by saying, "...the so-called system of free enterprise is turning out to be powerless in competition with socialism such a complex and modern area as space research."

"If the newspapers printed a despach that the Soviet Union planned sending the first man to Hell, our federal agencies would appear the next day, crying, "We can't let them beat us to it!" --- Hyman Rickover, 1959

==== John Glenn ====
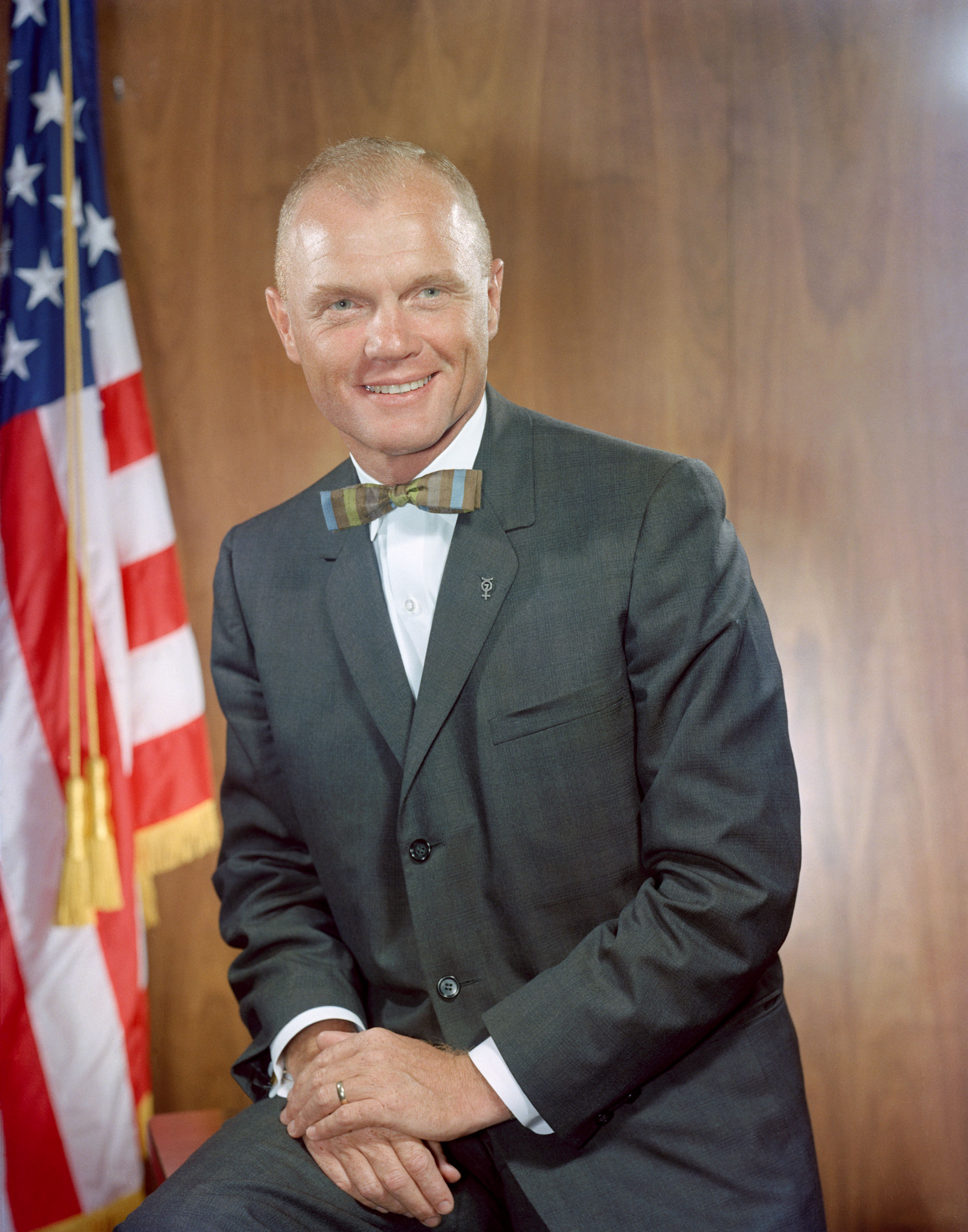
American Astronaut, John Glenn

In the United States, John Glenn is held in high honors. Being the first American to orbit the Earth was seen as a great American accomplishment. It was an important step to catching up with the Soviet Union during the Space Race. Glenn, in addition to becoming a successful astronaut, also became a successful politician. He successfully ran for the United States Senate. Later on, NASA honored his flight into space with a website that takes the viewer through John Glenn's Mission of Freedom 7. The United States Post Office issued a commemorative stamp. There are also schools named after John Glenn.

==== John F. Kennedy's election ====
When John F. Kennedy became President of the United States there was a question about how to catch up with the Soviet Union. Kennedy did not want to "... place safety about the desire to gain some additional prestige". However, there pressure was there from Congress when Overton Brooks, who was the Chairman of the House Space Committee said, "any step-up in the space program must be designed to accelerate a civilian program of peaceful space exploration and use....This very important from the standpoint of international relations." James E. Webb had a meeting with President Kennedy to help convince him the need to spend resources in the area of space. In this meeting he stated, "...it will be possible through new technology to bring about a whole new areas of international cooperation in meteorology and communications...The extent to which we are leaders in space science and technology will in large measure determine the extent to which we, as a nation, pioneering on a new frontier, will be in a position to develop the emerging world forces and make it the basis for new concepts and application in education, communications, and transportation, looking towards more viable political, social, and economic systems for nations willing to work with us in the years ahead." President Kennedy saw the benefits of the space program as both domestic and international. Kennedy had had a string a failures from Laos to the Congo, the Bay of Pigs Invasion and Gagarin. Vice President Lyndon Johnson was put in charge of America's objectives in space. In a report to President Kennedy he stated, "The Soviets led the United States in prestige; the United States had failed to marshal its superior technological resources; the United States should recognize that countries tend to line up with the country they believe to be the leader; if the United States did not act, the Soviet "margin of control" would get beyond our ability to catch up; even in areas where the Soviets led, the United States had to make aggressive efforts; manned exploration of the Moon was a great propaganda value but was essential whether or not the United States was first." Further on in the meeting Johnson stated, "One can predict with confidence that failure to master space means being second best in the crucial arena of our Cold War world. In the eyes of the world, first in space means first period; second in space is second in everything."

==== Moon landing ====
On July 20, 1969 the United States landed on the Moon. This was seen as an American victory in space. The plaque that was left on the base of the lander states that "We came in peace for all mankind".

==== The term "space race" in contemporary use ====
Politicians and journalists will use the phrase space race to stimulate controversy, interest, or competition. The term was used during the Cold War to describe the competition between the US and the USSR. Today the phrase is used by journalists frequently to draw attention to competing countries developing technology and access to space. As Time Magazine states, “Space exploration is a powerful rallying point for national pride… The contest may not be accompanied by the blaring cold-war overtones of the last great space race between the U.S. and the Soviet Union. China's space program is conducted largely in secret, and Japan's modest achievements don't make headlines. But plenty is at stake. Over the past few years, a centuries-old rivalry between China and Japan has flared anew. While the two countries are increasingly interdependent economically, relations remain uncomfortably strained as fast-growing China begins to challenge Japan as the preeminent East Asian power. This spring, for example, anti-Japan riots erupted in a number of Chinese cities, and diplomatic disputes over natural-gas-field rights in the East China Sea continue to rage.

Furthermore, journalists also describe how the race can lead to other fearful races. As Kyle Niemeyer discusses in his article Asia’s Space Race Could Turn into an Arms Race, “The major Asian nations, including China, Japan, India, and South Korea, are all expanding their space programs with little-to-no cooperation. These efforts are driven by national prestige and geopolitical rivalries, similar to the US-Soviet space race of the 1960s. Like that period, this space race is stimulating technological advances, but competing agendas are leading to duplication of work and mistrust—in other words, a waste of resources. Even worse, this competition is undermining recent cooperation between the US, Russia, and Europe."

Another Time magazine article titled "Sino-Japanese Space Race", states, “With Asia's biggest powers set to launch their first unmanned lunar missions — possibly as early as next month — the countdown has begun in the hottest space race since the United States beat the Soviet Union to the Moon nearly four decades ago."

== European space pursuits ==
Europeans are also proud of their contributions to space. As Brid-Aine Parnell points out in her piece for The A Register, "The government is fond of bandying about the idea that the UK space sector already generates £9bn a year, but in fact this is a completely made-up figure concocted by counting Sky TV and a few other "downstream space" companies as though they were satellite makers or something. Chancellor George Osborne said that the increased spending on ESA would bring substantial benefits to the UK adding that the private sector had already identified projects worth up to £1bn that “will flow” from the investment. Clearly, the expectation is that more contracts will come Britain's way if it ups its investment in ESA at a time when other European countries are finding the spare change to fund their existing obligations."

== Chinese space pursuits ==
The People's Republic of China have also used their accomplishment in space as a form of internal and external propaganda. The word rocket itself means firing arrow. The concept of rocketry was first developed in China during the 3rd century A.D. Modern Chinese advancement are given credit to Tsien Hsue Shen. In 2012 China released a film honoring the 100th anniversary of his birthday. Chinese Communist Party general secretary Hu Jintao opened a library commemorating his birth.

The Cultural Revolution in China affected the space program and there were competing for attention. “Subsequent histories recorded that the revolutionaries spread the slogan that “when the satellite goes up, the red flag goes down’ and urged concentration on the political rather than the scientific. However once the Chinese had accomplished a successful satellite launch the official announcement was, “We did it through our own unaided efforts” despite the fact that several Russian scientist had assisted with the program up until the Sino-Soviet split. The Chinese treated the successful launch as one of the greatest events of the century, which included nationwide parades and celebrations. The satellite itself broadcast “the east is Red”

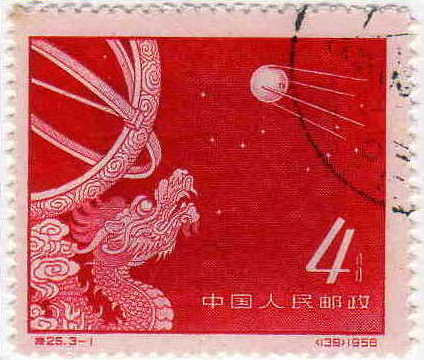
Chinese Postage Stamp depicting the Soviet Sputnik 1

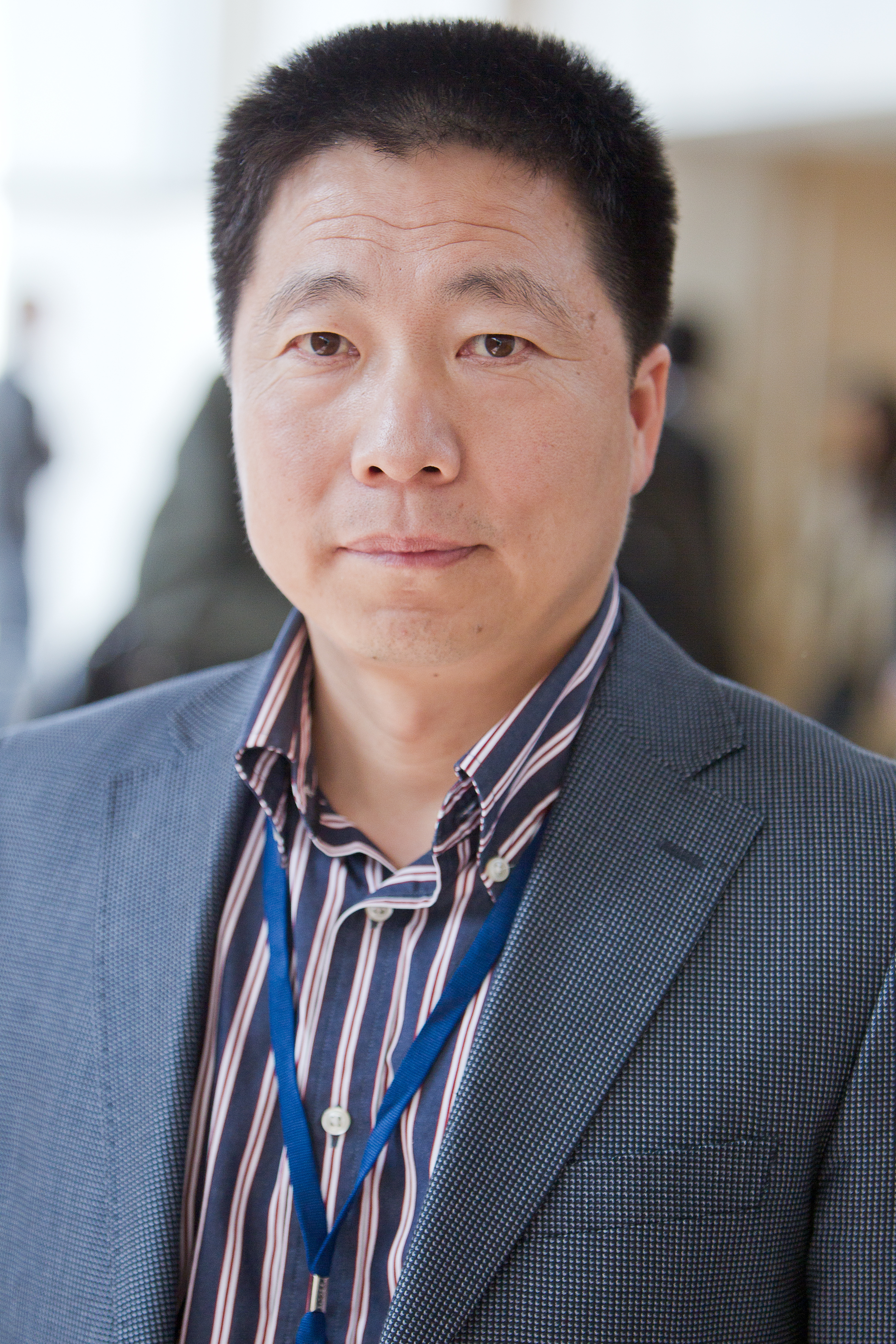
First Chinese man in space, Yang Liwei

Even though the United States landed on the Moon in 1969, there is no more space race, and the Soviet Union no longer exists, there are still forms of space propaganda. The most widely used of which can be found in the People's Republic of China. The Chinese space program began in the 1960s but it was not internationally recognized until the launching of Shenzhou V, which put China's first astronaut into space. The Chinese had successfully launched a satellite in the 1970s. There was a pause in the Chinese program for a couple decades, but was picked up again and restarted as a way for the party to instill confidence and patriotism. With the rise of its space program it is now considered a modern country that can stand with the west. Col. Yang Liwei became an instant celebrity in China. Millions of stamps were issued with his face on them to show this great accomplishment.

TV commercials in China since 2003 have shown an astronaut walking on the Moon demonstrating the ultimate goal of the Chinese program. Space images in China have been used as a manner of inspiration, but also to bring people under control. It is believed that in the near term China will start using female astronauts to demonstrate further successes with the space program.

China is also using space based missile technology as propaganda. China has developed and tested an anti-satellite weapon. Despite the fact that China has pledged to ban space based weapons, this demonstration to the world proved that they have developed them and could use them if need be.

== Sources of propaganda ==
=== Posters ===
Propaganda posters, largely political in nature, that seek to assert technological superiority over rival powers.
In particular, Space Race propaganda posters frequently feature religious themes (or themes of atheism and anti-religion, in the case of the Soviet Union). These themes contribute to the concept of military and technological prowess that are associated with space superiority.

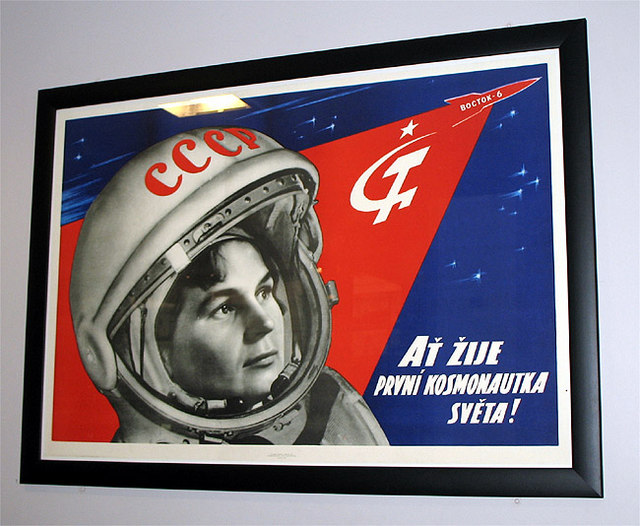
Poster depicting Valentina Vladimirovna Tereshkova, the first woman in space

=== Memorabilia ===
Stamps, patches, and other memorabilia characterizing significant spacefaring achievements were of great popularity during the Space Race period, and widely disbursed as a symbol of national pride.

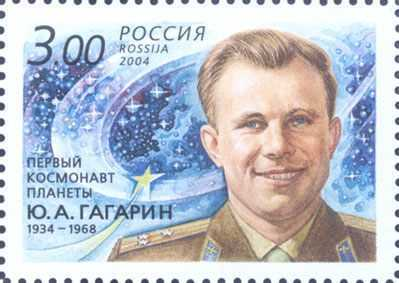
Postage Stamp depicting Soviet Astronaut Yuri Gagarin

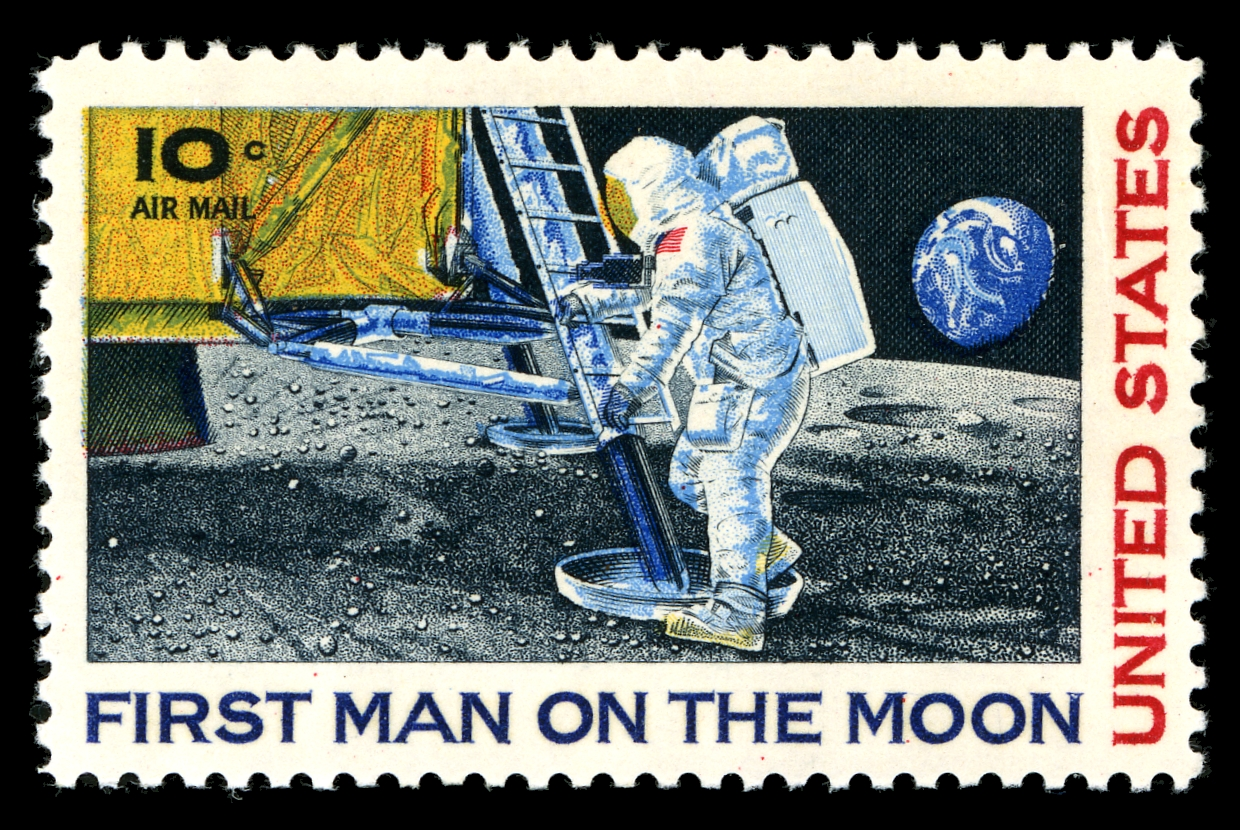
Postage Stamp depicting Neil Armstrong's first steps on the Moon

=== Art ===
Space agencies, like the United States' NASA, are known for publishing art that promotes space science, through artists' interpretations of astronomical bodies, such as the hypothetical surfaces of exoplanets or colorization of observed objects like galaxies and nebulae

==== Examples ====
- "First Look" by Mitchell Jamieson.

Commissioned by NASA. It shows an astronaut's expression as he looks into space for the first time.

- "First Steps" by Mitchell Jamieson. Depicts astronaut Gordon Cooper leaving the Mercury capsule.
- "The New Olympus" by Alden Wicks. This painting shows the Vehicle Assembly Building at Cape Canaveral Florida, which would be a "suitable temple for the new race of gods."

=== Books ===
Science fiction books are a popular genre of writing that seek to speculate on a possible future, transformed by innovative scientific discoveries beyond contemporary understanding. As a genre, it is frequently credited for inspiring interest in modern science as well as genuine scientific innovations.

==== Examples ====
- From the Earth to the Moon, science fiction book from 1865 known for its remarkable detail and accuracy in describing the hypothetical process of shooting a person to the Moon.

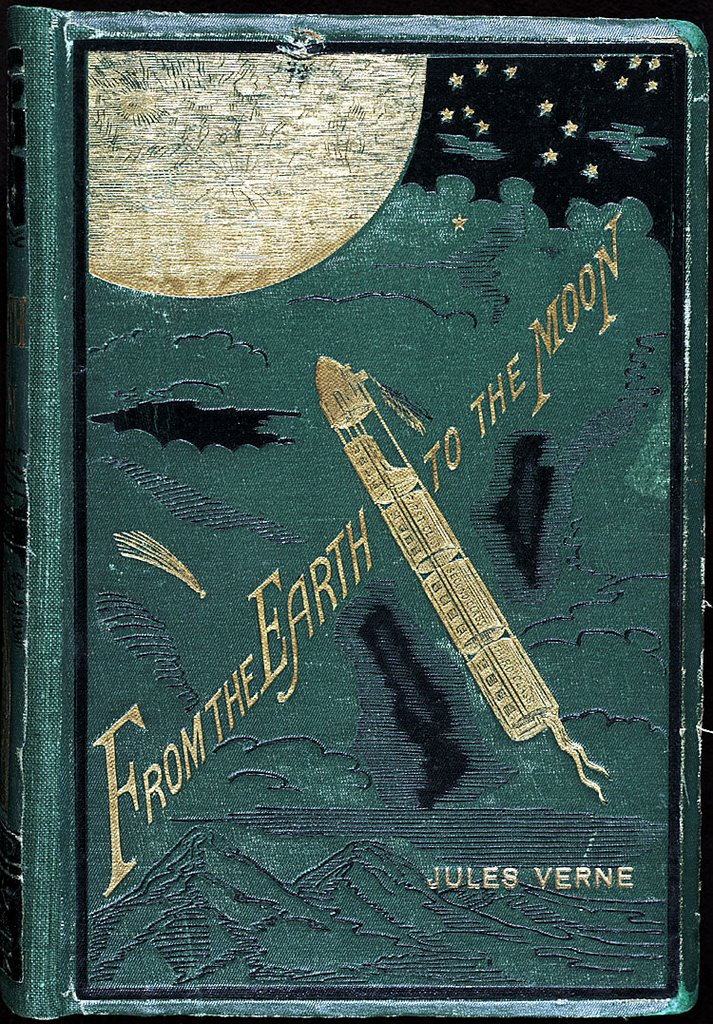
From the Earth to the Moon, the 1865 novel by Jules Verne

=== Music ===
==== Examples ====
- Space Oddity (1969), a story regarding a fictional astronaut "Major Tom", largely focused on the desolation of space. Astronaut Chris Hadfield notably played a cover of Space Oddity, making it the first song ever performed in space.
- In 1973, the music group Electric Light Orchestra (ELO) dedicated one of its most popular songs "Don't Bring Me Down" to the U.S. space station Skylab.

=== Film ===
Film has been used as a form of space propaganda, largely to present space science and exploration to the general public in an approachable and informative (though frequently dramatized) form.

==== Examples ====
- The Right Stuff, historical film exploring the lives of the Mercury Seven astronaut team.
- Space Camp, commercial failure; controversial due to releasing following the Space Shuttle Challenger disaster.
- In 1998 HBO released a television miniseries, From the Earth to the Moon. This was hosted by Tom Hanks whose role in the film Apollo 13 assisted in the success of the series. The series, as explained by Hanks, was to give the viewer an accurate as possible view to the many episodes of the space race.
- In 2008 NASA worked with the Discovery Channel to create a documentary series entitled When We Left Earth. The documentary used footage of the space race along with interviews from the people who worked on the project. It was narrated by Gary Sinise, who also played in the Apollo 13 film. The release also coincided with a presidential campaign in which one of the topics was the next steps of the American space program.
- Even though Star Wars was not created as a propaganda film and was created as a science fiction space opera, there are references to the Cold War within the film. At one point during the commentary for Return of the Jedi, George Lucas commented that he wanted the arrival of the Emperor to the Death Star to look intimidating and fearful, "...to look like May Day in Russia."
- Several of the James Bond film series: Dr. No, You Only Live Twice, Moonraker, Diamonds Are Forever, GoldenEye, Tomorrow Never Dies, Die Another Day, and Quantum of Solace touch on themes of space exploration. According to John Cork, author of James Bond Legacy, "James Bond was the first hero of the space age.... The Mercury 7 astronauts were being trained right as Dr. No was coming out." The plot of the first Bond film, Dr. No, is about how the villain Dr. No attempts to disrupt the Mercury program. In the film You Only Live Twice, astronauts are held captive in an attempt to initiate World War III. The opening scene of the film depicts astronauts getting killed in space. Satellite weapons and Moon vehicles are depicted in Diamonds Are Forever. Bond becomes the astronaut himself in Moonraker. According to Cork, "They deal with the ideas of manipulation of satellites. They really are dealing with the way the space program works now: We're sending up incredible sophisticated satellites.... Ian Fleming was fascinated by rocketry and space. He even communicated with Arthur C. Clarke."

=== Public speeches ===
Several public speeches from government officials regarding space science and space programs have been of significant influence towards public interest, particularly during the Space Race.

==== John F. Kennedy ====
On September 12, 1962, during the first years of the Space Race, President of the United States John F. Kennedy gave a speech arguing for a United States space program.

There is no strife, no prejudice, no national conflict in outer space as yet. Its hazards are hostile to us all. Its conquest deserves the best of all mankind, and its opportunity for peaceful cooperation may never come again. But why, some say, the Moon? Why choose this as our goal? And they may well ask why climb the highest mountain? Why, 35 years ago, fly the Atlantic? Why does Rice play Texas? We choose to go to the Moon. We choose to go to the Moon in this decade and do the other things, not because they are easy, but because they are hard, because that goal will serve to organize and measure the best of our energies and skills, because that challenge is one that we are willing to accept, one we are unwilling to postpone, and one which we intend to win, and the others, too. It is for these reasons that I regard the decision last year to shift our efforts in space from low to high gear as among the most important decisions that will be made during my incumbency in the office of the Presidency.

This speech is considered influential in the creation of the Apollo Program, and a significant inflection point in the ambitions of American space exploration.

==== George W. Bush ====
After the destruction of the Columbia Shuttle in 2003, the Bush administration tried to reinvigorate NASA with the Constellation Program. The program aimed to build a heavy-lift rocket similar to the Saturn V and establish a Moon base to aid in future missions. President Bush stated, “Today I announce a new plan to explore space and extend a human presence across our solar system. We will begin the effort quickly, using existing programs and personnel. We'll make steady progress -- one mission, one voyage, one landing at a time.” The plan called for a new rocket to be in place and usable in 2015, return to the Moon by 2017 and start a permanent lunar base by 2020.

==== Barack Obama ====
“The bottom line is nobody is more committed to manned space flight, to human exploration of space than I am."

== Private sector ==
Private spaceflight organizations, unbeholden to any government compared to their public counterparts, make use of private funding and advertising to spread influence. Compared to the heavily dampened funding of space agencies since the Space Race, some consider private spaceflight companies an alternative to kickstarting new interest in space exploration.

=== Examples ===
- SpaceX
- Virgin Galactic

== Non-profit organizations ==
- The One Giant Leap Foundation is an organization that promotes the commercialization of space.
- The Space Foundation is a nonprofit organization that advocates for the "space industry" and the peaceful use of space.

== See also ==
- Sputnik crisis
- Science fiction
- List of government space agencies
- List of private spaceflight companies

== Bibliography ==
- Burgess, Colin; Hall, Rex (2009). The First Soviet Cosmonaut Team. Chichester, UK: Praxis Publishing. ISBN 978-0-387-84824-2. LCCN 2008935694.
- Hall, Rex; Shayler, David J. (2001). The Rocket Men: Vostok & Voskhod, The First Soviet Manned Spaceflights. New York: Springer–Praxis Books. ISBN 1-85233-391-X.
- McDougall, Walter A. (1985). "Roots of Technocracy: ... The Heavens and the Earth. Political History of the Space Age". Science. 230 (4730). New York: Basic Books: 1154. doi:10.1126/science.230.4730.1154. PMID 17739121.
