= Ellen Levy =

American multimedia artist and scholar

Ellen K. Levy
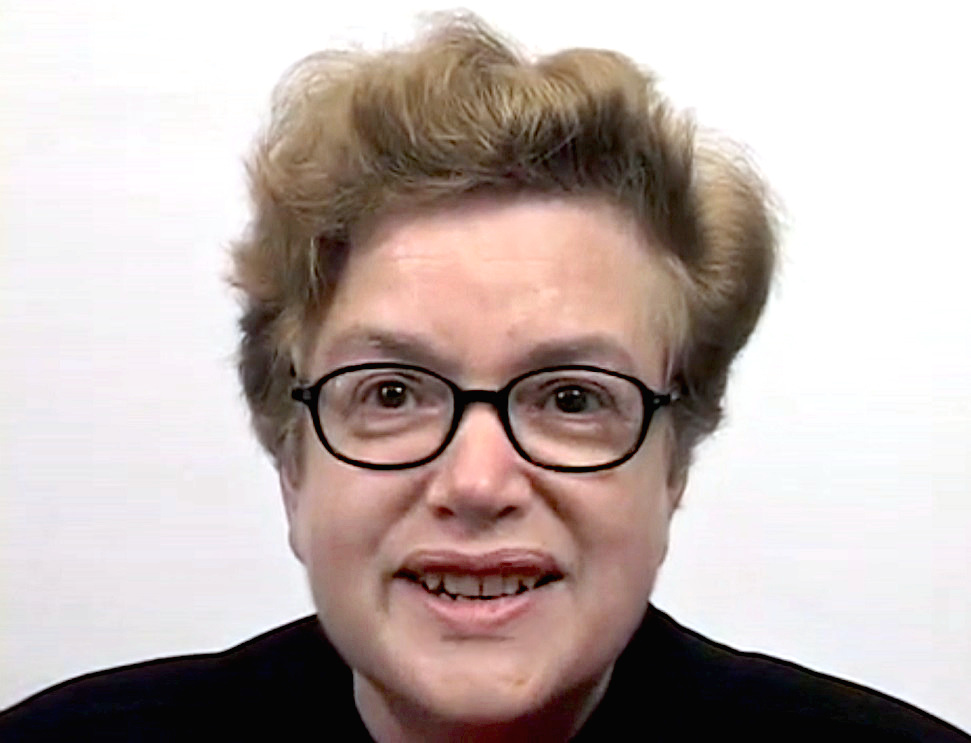
- Levy in Speaking Portraits c.2003
- Born: New York, New York, United States
- Education: University of Plymouth, Ph.D., 2012; School of the Museum of Fine Arts, Boston, 1981; Mount Holyoke College, B.A.
- Occupations: Artist and scholar
- Known for: Multimedia art, art-science collaborations
- Awards: Long listed for the Historians of British Art Book Prize in 2022 for co-editing the anthology D'Arcy Wentworth Thompson's Generative Influences in Art, Design, and Architecture
- Website: www.complexityart.com

Ellen K. Levy is an American multimedia artist, writer, curator, and educator whose interdisciplinary work explores the intersections of art, science, technology, and the environment. Since the early 1980s, she has investigated how scientific paradigms, including neuroscience, evolution, and complexity theory, inform visual culture and artistic practice. Levy has exhibited internationally and published widely on the role of visual art in shaping and interpreting scientific knowledge.

Through her evolving career, Levy has examined how art–science collaborations influence social and political movements, environmental activism, and contemporary art's role in public discourse. Her work emphasizes the interdisciplinarity of design across engineering, art, and technology, informed by emergent scientific ideas. She has engaged with themes such as morphology, systems theory, and eco-catastrophe, positioning her among artists who bridge visual culture and scientific inquiry. Science historian and author Arthur I. Miller has described her more recent work as focusing on "the convergence of biology and information systems and the borders of the animate and inanimate."

She has examined how art-science collaborations have influenced social and political movements, encouraged environmental activism, and shaped contemporary art's evolving role. Levy has emphasized the interdisciplinarity of design across engineering, art, and technology, often involving practitioners engaged with emerging technologies. Her studies on morphology, systems theory, and eco-catastrophe have positioned her among key figures bridging visual culture and scientific inquiry. She has engaged with the interrelationships among art, science, and technology through exhibitions, educational programs, publications, and curatorial work since the mid-1980s. As artist Leslie Wayne reflected, “one of [Levy's] signal achievements was the way in which she's placed art and science in dialogue.” Levy and Philip Galanter have similarly written that “the study of complexity creates bridges across many branches of science and offers a revolutionary intellectual vector that has ramifications for other disciplines, such as art and philosophy.”

Her artwork spans painting, installation, animation, and digital media, frequently engaging archival sources, scientific diagrams, and layered imagery to interrogate systems of knowledge and perception. She has collaborated with institutions including NASA's Art Program on Space Chrysalis in 1985 and Leonardo, the International Society for the Arts, Sciences and Technology. Her research explores form, matter, and ecological crisis, and she has contributed to scholarship morphology, perception, and art-science intersections.

== Education ==
Levy earned a BA in Zoology from Mount Holyoke College. She later received her MFA in Visual Arts from the School of the Museum of Fine Arts, Boston, in affiliation with Tufts University. During her time in Boston, she worked in the pharmacology department at Harvard Medical School, where she was exposed to research by David Hubel and Torsten Wiesel on neural mechanisms of visual perception. She earned her doctorate from the University of Plymouth in 2012 on the study of art and the neuroscience of attention.

== Career ==
Levy's career has combined art making, curatorial work, activism and interdisciplinary scholarship. Her early projects explored perception and systems theory through painting and installation. Over time, her work increasingly incorporated scientific concepts such as morphology, genetics, and complex adaptive systems. In parallel, she contributed essays, curated exhibitions, and collaborated with scientific institutions, advancing dialogue between the arts and sciences.

== Interdisciplinary art ==
FEAST (Fostering Ecocentric Art and Science Together), is the result of a collaboration between Levy and Victoria Vesna in partnership with the Center for Photography at Woodstock (CPW). The series explores the intersections of food, climate, and health, bringing together artists, scientists, and the public to examine links between ecological systems and human well-being. It is supported by a seed grant from the Burroughs Wellcome Fund. In July 2025, FEAST II: Let the Plants Carry Us was curated by Kathy High. Levy serves on the advisory board of CPW.

In 2024, she presented Seeing Through at the University of Dundee's Tower Foyer Gallery and the D’Arcy Thompson Zoology Museum, building on her long-term engagement with D’Arcy Thompson's theories of morphology and broader interdisciplinary themes. The exhibition reimagined zoological specimens as hybridized organic-technological forms, influenced by the speculative visions of J.G. Ballard and Richard Hamilton. It reflected her sustained work with D’Arcy Thompson's theories of morphology, first explored in a 1982 solo show at Baruch College and developed through her 2014 research residency at Dundee. This work culminated in her co-editing the 2021 anthology D'Arcy Wentworth Thompson's Generative Influences in Art, Design, and Architecture, long listed for the Historians of British Art (HBA) Book Prize in 2022, and curating the 2022 exhibition From Forces to Forms. Conversations with Stephen Jay Gould, who wrote the foreword to a later edition of Wentworth Thompson's On Growth and Form, further shaped her thinking about Thompson's mathematical and physical models of form. Levy has cited Thompson's emphasis on form and matter as a major influence on her work and that of many contemporary artists, describing Seeing Through as "the culmination of decades of engagement with D’Arcy Thompson's ideas." Her ongoing dialogue with Thompson's legacy underscores Levy's broader commitment to examining how scientific models of form, matter, and transformation resonate across contemporary art and design.

Levy, "whose fascination with technology is not only tinged by skepticism but also rivaled by an interest in the acts of God that are sometimes visited on grand technological schemes -- witness the Challenger," was one of the early artists commissioned by the NASA Art Program, in 1985. Her early career focused on painting and exhibitions at then alternative science spaces such as the New York Academy of Sciences in 1984, NASA; and the National Academy of Sciences, and is also in their collection. She has had numerous solo exhibitions in the United States and abroad, including at Associated American Artists and Michael Steinberg Fine Arts in New York City. Shared Premises: Innovation and Adaptation was exhibited at the National Technical Museum in Prague. Her work was also included in the Second Moscow Biennale of Contemporary Art exhibit, Petroliana (Oil Patriotism).

Her talks and exhibitions explore attention, perception, and genetics, including human error and inattention blindness in Stealing Attention; in exhibitions involving the environment such as Weather Report and Climate Change, (2004) curated by Lucy Lippard, and Face Off (2004), curated by Ronald Feldman; and a two-person exhibition based on data from the magazine Skeptical Inquirer; and in her New York Public Library site-specific exhibition Meme Machines, using mixed media to visualize cultural evolution and ways of creating and transmitting knowledge, which was also the subject of an Art Talk interview with novelist Siri Hustvedt.

== Extended art and science activities ==
Former chair of Leonardo/ISAST's LEAF (Leonardo Education and Art Forum) initiative, Levy co-directs, with Patricia Olynyk, the New York City-based Leonardo Art and Science Evening Rendezvous (LASER), part of Leonardo/ISAST's international program of evening gatherings that brings artists and scientists together for informal presentations and conversations. A twice invited participant to The Watermill Center's Art & Consciousness Workshop, she was President of the College Art Association from 2004 to 2006, Special Advisor on the Arts and Sciences at the Institute for Doctoral Studies in the Visual Arts(IDSVA) from 2012 to 2017, and a Distinguished Visiting Fellow in Arts and Sciences at Skidmore College in 1999, a position funded by the Henry Luce Foundation, and named one of the 66 Brilliant Women in Creative Technology. She has taught transdisciplinary classes and workshops at The New School, Cooper Union, Brooklyn College, and the Banff Centre for Arts and Creativity.

Don't Cry in Space, Ellen Levy, acrylic and gel over unique print, 2020

Levy has published in many books and journals including Leonardo/ISAST's journal Leonardo. In 1996 she was guest editor of Art Journal's Contemporary Art and the Genetic Code, the first widely distributed, in-depth academic publication about contemporary artistic responses to genetics, genomics, which included articles by Stephen J. Gould, Roald Hoffmann, Robert Root-Bernstein, Martin Kemp, and Dorothy Nelkin, and was cited in Cambridge University Press's Science in Context, Writing Modern Art and Science – An Overview. Her article Contemporary Art and the Genetic Code: New Models and Methods of Representation, was cited in Stephen Wilson's 2003's Information Arts, Intersections of Art, Science, and Technology, an introduction to the work and ideas of "a who's who of international scenemakers," artists who use and influence science and technology; and in 2016, with her essay Art Enters the Biotechnology Debate: Questions of Ethics, was listed in Oxford University Press's authoritative guide to the current scholarship on Science and Contemporary Art. Barbara Larson and Ellen Levy are co-editors of the Science and the Arts Since 1750 six title book series published by Routledge.

== Selected bibliography ==
- D'Arcy Wentworth Thompson's Generative Influences in Art, Design, and Architecture From Forces to Forms, Eds. Ellen K. Levy, Charissa N. Terranova; Bloomsbury Visual Arts, London; March 2021, ISBN 9781350191136
- Book Series: Science and the Arts since 1750, Eds., Barbara Larson, Ellen K. Levy; 2017 - 2021, Routledge Press, US and UK.
- "Enraptured: Attention and Art," Perception and Agency in Shared Spaces of Contemporary Art, Eds., C.Albu and D. Schuld; 171-183, 2017, Routledge Press, US and UK.
- "Classifying Kubler: Between the Complexity of Science and Art," Im Maschenwerk der Kunstgeschichte, Eds., S. Maupeu, K. Schankweiler, S. Stallschus; 225-245, Kulturverlag Kadmos, Berlin, 2014.
- "Sleuthing the Mind," Leonardo, 47 ( 5), 427-435, 2014 doi:10.1162/LEON a 00864
- "Contemporary Art and the Aesthetics of Natural Selection," Darwin and Theories of Aesthetics and Cultural History, Eds., Barbara Larson and Sabine Flach, Aldershot, UK: Ashgate Press, 145-165, 2013
- "Neuroscience and the Arts Today," in PAJ, 35 (3), 8-23, 2013, doi:10.1162/PAJJ-a-00157
- "Bioart and Nanoart in a Museum Context: Terms of Engagement," Ed., J. Marstine; The Routledge Companion to Museum Ethics: Redefining Ethics for the Twenty-First Century Museum, 445-464, 2011, Routledge Press, US and UK.
- "Defining Life: Artists Challenge Conventional Classifications," Eds., M. Lovejoy, C. Paul, V. Vesna; Context Providers, 275-299, 2011, Intellect Press, Bristol and University of Chicago Press, Chicago, ISBN 9781841503080
- "Cultural Evolution," Ed., Leonardo Journal, 43 (5), 420, 2010, doi:10.1162/LEON e 00032
- "Art Enters the Biotechnology Debate: Questions of Ethics," Eds., G. Levin, E. King; Ethics and the Visual Arts, Ch. 16, 199-216, Allworth Press, New York, 2006, ISBN 9781581158229
- "Complexity" with Philip Galanter and Manuel A. Báez, Leonardo, volume 36, issue 4, pp. 259–267, 2003 doi:10.1162/002409403322258583
- "The Genome and Art: Finding Potential in Unknown Places," Leonardo, 34 (2), 2014, 172-175. 2001, doi:10.1162/002409401750184762
- "Contemporary Art and the Genetic Code," Art Journal, Levy, E., Ed. with Sichel, B., 55 (1) Spring Issue 1996, College Art Association, New York, doi:10.1080/00043249.1996.10791734
- "Monkey in the Middle: PreDarwinian Evolutionary Thought and Artistic Creation," Perspectives in Biology and Medicine, Levy, E., Levy, D., & Goldberg, M (1986), 3 (1): 95-106, 1986. doi:10.1353/pbm.1986.0092
