= Leonardo Music Journal =

- Discipline: Music, sound art
- Language: English
- Edited by: Roger Malina

Publication details
- History: 1968-present
- Publisher: MIT Press (United States)
- Frequency: Annually

Standard abbreviations
- ISO 4: Leonardo Music J.

Indexing
- ISSN: 0961-1215 (print); 1531-4812 (web)
- OCLC no.: 44911674

Links
- Journal homepage; Online access

Leonardo Music Journal is an annual multimedia peer-reviewed academic journal (print and audio CD) published by the MIT Press on behalf of Leonardo, The International Society of the Arts, Sciences and Technology. The journal was established in 1991 and publishes the work of artists who are inventing media, implementing developing technologies, and expanding the boundaries of radical and experimental aesthetics. The journal is a companion volume to Leonardo. The editor-in-chief is Roger Malina (University of Texas at Dallas).
