= Patricia Olynyk =

Canadian-American artist, scholar and educator

- Born: Regina, Saskatchewan, Canada
- Education: MFA, California College of the Arts; Diploma of Visual Art, Alberta University of the Arts, Kyoto Seika University
- Known for: One of the first artists in the US appointed to a university science unit.
- Website: www.patriciaolynyk.com

Dark Skies, detail, a multi-channel projection on large-scale CNC routed tiles with soundscape

Patricia Olynyk is a Canadian-born American multimedia artist, scholar and educator whose work explores art, science, and technology-related themes. Known for collaborating across disciplines and projects that explore the mind-brain relationship, interspecies communication and the phenomenology of perception, her work examines "the way that experiences and biases toward scientific subjects affect interpretations in specific contexts."

== Education ==
Olynyk received an MFA with Distinction from the California College of the Arts. She was a Monbusho Scholar and Tokyu Foundation Research Scholar at Kyoto Seika University.

== Career ==
Olynyk's multi-sensory installations explore the "concept of "umwelt," as described in the semiotic theories of Jakob von Uexküll and interpreted by Thomas A. Sebeok (1976)... the world as it is experienced by a particular organism. As such, umwelt evokes more than environment; it emphasizes an organism's ability to sense — a condition for the existence of shared signs." Her collaborations on third culture projects uncover the deeper meaning behind the history and evolution of science and technology; how people, culture and institutions shape the understanding of science, history and the natural world.

Her cross-disciplinary work often includes microscopy and biomedical imaging, and is described as "something uncanny... where one's consciousness can neither respond in a unified way to the bodily sensations or float free in imaginary space; it is caught in the in-between." Influenced by the early work of the MIT Center for Advanced Visual Studies, and the art and visual perception theories of Rudolf Arnheim, Olynyk was one of the first artists in the US appointed to a university science unit, is listed as one of the 66 Brilliant Women in Creative Technology, and has programmed art, science and technology curriculum, symposiums and fellowships at research institutions.

Solo exhibitions include Sensing Terrains at the National Academy of Sciences in Washington, D.C. in 2006, and at the Center for Biotechnology and Interdisciplinary Studies, Rensselaer Polytechnic Institute, Troy, New York in 2007; Dark Skies at the Art I Sci Center Gallery at UCLA in 2012, Transfigurations at Galeria Grafica Tokio, Japan in 2003, and The Mutable Archive, at Bruno David Gallery, St. Louis, Missouri in 2020.

Olynyk was part of a three-person exhibition, Umwelt, which took "the concept of collaboration to new heights and complications," at the Zooid Institute Collective, BioBAT Art Space, at the Brooklyn Army Terminal in 2019. Group shows in New York also include, with Ellen Levy, Skeptical Inquirers at the Sidney Mishkin Gallery in 2016; Sleuthing the Mind at the Pratt Manhattan Gallery in 2014, and, Ephemeral: Unraveling History at the Ruth S. Harley Gallery in 2015.

Her work has been featured at Palazzo Michiel dalle Colonne for Venice Design 2018, the Los Angeles International Biennial, The Brooklyn Museum, the Saitama Modern Art Museum in Japan, Museo del Corso in Rome, and The Banff Centre for the Arts in Canada. She is represented by the Bruno David Gallery.

Olynyk was the US curator and a speaker at the CYFEST-12: ID, CYLAND International Media Art Festival, at the Saint Petersburg Stieglitz State Academy of Art and Design in Russia in 2019.

After 13 years as Director, and Florence and Frank Bush Professor of Art, at the Graduate School of Art, Sam Fox School of Design & Visual Arts, Washington University in St. Louis, Olynyk transitioned to the full time faculty in 2020. She was an associate professor at the University of Michigan's School of Art & Design, and director of the Penny W. Stamps Distinguished Visitors Program and the Roman J. Witt Visiting Faculty Program, supporting cross-disciplinary discourse and research. In 2005, she became the first non-scientist appointed to the university's Life Sciences Institute.

Former Chair of the Leonardo Education and Art Forum, a branch of Leonardo, the International Society for the Arts, Sciences and Technology, Olynyk co-directs the Leonardo/ISAST New York LASER program with Ellen K. Levy, promoting cross-disciplinary exchange between artists, scientists, and scholars.

== Awards and fellowships ==
Awards include a Helmut S. Stern Fellowship at the Institute for the Humanities, University of Michigan, and a Francis C. Wood Fellowship at the College of Physicians and Mütter Museum in Philadelphia. Olynyk's residencies include UCLA's Design Media Arts Department, Banff Center for the Arts in Canada, Montalvo Arts Center in California, the University of Applied Arts Vienna, and at Europe's oldest asylum, the Narrenturm, also in Vienna.

== Selected bibliography ==
- "Minding the Gap: Risk Capital and the Myth of Two Cultures," editorial for Leonardo, Vol. 45, No. 1, MIT Press, 2012
- "Evolving Third Culture Thinking in Art and Science" chapter, Conversations Across Cultures: Perspectives in Art and Education, De Gruyter Press, 2015
- "Fantastic Voyage and Other Scales of Wonder" chapter, The Routledge Handbook to Biology in Art and Architecture, Routledge Press, 2015
- "Art + the Brain: Stories + Structures" catalogue, Art + the Brain: Stories and Structures Symposium, co-author and co-editor; essay author,"Phantom Bodies + Mutable Archives", Art I Sci Center, California Nanosystems Institute, UCLA, Los Angeles, California, Art I Sci Center, June 2016
- "Synthesizing Fields: Art, Complexism and the Space Beyond Now, Technoetic Arts, Complexism: Art + Architecture + Biology + Computation, A New Axis in Critical Theory?, Intellect Press, Volume 14, Issue 1–2, 2016
- "Creature Comforts and the Ties that Bind," Public Journal 59: Interspecies Communication, York University, Summer 2019
- "The Art of Medicine: A New Medical Humanities Gateway Course" chapter, Teaching Artistic Research, Conversations Across Cultures, De Gruyter Press, May 2020
