= Its Name Was Penelope =

Fictional story by Judy Malloy

its name was Penelope
- Author: Judy Malloy
- Genre: Hypertext fiction, Electronic literature
- Publisher: Eastgate Systems
- Publication date: 1993

Its Name Was Penelope (stylized in lowercase as its name was Penelope) is a hypertext fictional story created by Judy Malloy and published in various versions, including 1993 by Eastgate Systems. The work makes use of digital elements such as randomized passages to tell the story of the main character's life.

== Plot ==
its name was Penelope is centered around a fictional artist and photographer based in California named Anne Mitchell. Anne's life is told in different phases represented by each of the six sections of the story.

=== Story structure and navigation ===
The story contains six sections that are based on books from the Odyssey. The parts are titled: Dawn, A Gathering of Souls, That Far-Off Island, Fine Work and Wide Across, Rock and a Hard Place, and Song. Aside from Song, all passages within each part are randomized. Each passage is meant to act like a photograph in an album that represents the memories of Anne's life. The work is formed like a stack of cards, and five of the sections are shuffled randomly so that a new text space appears. The sixth section uses fixed links. Anne Mitchell, the narrator, follows her life as she listens to her father read about Odysseus. The work resonates with Homer's Penelope in her weaving and her lover. She is bitter about daily city life when Odysseus is gone, and when Odysseus returns, she leaves with him to the country and finds happiness.

=== Genre ===
its name was Penelope is a fictional work that incorporates the real lived experiences of Malloy and other artists that she is acquainted with. Due to the nature of hypertext as a medium, the story takes a nonlinear path and can be interacted with by the reader. The digital approach to storytelling allows for a wider range of elements and permits the author to lay out a story spatially rather than linearly. Malloy uses this to her advantage in the story by incorporating randomization elements to convey the nonlinear reality of resurfacing memories.

== Origins and influences ==
When writing its name was Penelope, Malloy was inspired by the Odyssey, which was read to her by her father at a young age. The Odyssey inspired both Uncle Roger, another story by Malloy, and gave its name was Penelope its structure. Malloy studied the poem with William Harris at Middlebury College. In later versions such as the iPad edition and 2016 edition, Malloy included her own translations. She compares the main character in the Odyssey, Odysseus, with Anne, emphasizing the pursuit for knowledge that expands beyond generations and time.

== Publication history ==
its name was Penelope was originally created as an artists book in 1989. This version replicated its Greek origins with yellow text on a black background. It was made with Narrabase II, a generative hypertext authoring system, in BASIC on a 3.5 inch floppy disk. This version was made for an exhibition at the Richmond Art Center. In 1990 a small press Narrabase version was self-published by Judy Malloy who made a new cover and edited the text. This version was on a 5.25 inch floppy disk and was distributed by Art Com Software. A copy of this version is preserved in the Judy Malloy Papers at the David M. Rubenstein Rare Book & Manuscript Library at Duke University. In 1993 its name was Penelope was published by Eastgate Systems. This edition includes both a Macintosh version which was released first, and a Windows version, both were on a 3.5 inch floppy disk. In 1998 the work was also published to a CD-ROM with no changes to its 1993 version. In 2012 an iPad version was started, but to date has not been completed. In 2016 the Critical Code Studies Working Group created a DOSBox emulation of the 1993 publication. Two copies of the 1993 publication are housed in the Electronic Literature Organization's The NEXT, Library, and Preservation Space, hosted at Washington State University Vancouver.

== Reception ==
=== Awards ===
In 2020 Judy Malloy was presented with the Marjorie C. Luesebrink Career Achievement Award by the Electronic Literature Organization in part for its name was Penelope. The award was funded by donations and was awarded for bringing excellence to the field of electronic literature.

=== Critiques ===
Many readers at the time were not used to the randomization technique used in the work. Robert Coover reviewed the book in The New York Times on August 29, 1993. While he called it simple but elegant hyperfiction, he also noted that the random features took away control from the reader, which could be frustrating.

Richard Grant called the story's narration flat and monotone in his article in The Washington Post. He said the nonlinear aspect of hypertext fiction leaves the reader to decide when the story is finished.

== See also ==
- Cut-up technique
