= Sara Larkin =

American painter (1946–2018)

- Born: December 28, 1946; Quincy, Massachusetts, U.S.
- Died: November 21, 2018 (aged 71); Palm Beach, Florida, U.S.
- Education: University of Pennsylvania, Pennsylvania Academy of Fine Arts
- Movement: space art
- Website: saralarkin.com

Sara Larkin (December 28, 1946 – November 21, 2018) was an American painter who gained national attention for Spacescapes, a series of paintings celebrating America's achievements in space.

== Biography ==
Sara Larkin was born in Quincy, Massachusetts, United States, on December 28, 1946. She graduated from the University of Pennsylvania and Pennsylvania Academy of the Fine Arts, where she developed a lifelong association with Will Barnet. After receiving her degrees, she continued her education in Japan under the sponsorship of the philosopher and advisor to the Emperor of Cultural Affairs and President of Osei University, Tetsuo Tanikawa. Under his tutelage she became acquainted with Nobel Laureate Yasunari Kawabata. She spent a year in Bangkok, Thailand as the Women's and Social Editor of The Bangkok World. In Hong Kong, she studied Chinese art with the artist Lui Shou-Kwan, and Lawrence Tam, the Director of the Hong Kong Museum of Art. She also spent this time in Hong Kong, as a gallery owner, consultant, and artists’ agent.

In 1974, under the auspices of the Hong Kong Arts Festival, Larkin and her husband, Richard Lacey, organized its first exhibition of contemporary Chinese Art. She produced Shui-mo (Water and Ink) which discusses the status of the contemporary state of the Chinese painting tradition in the 20th century.

Between 1977 and 2002, Larkin maintained a studio and gallery in Washington, D.C. In 1992, she moved to Annapolis, Maryland, where she served as Artist in Residence at St. John's College. Until it was discontinued, in 2003, Larkin was a Sotheby Associate evaluating works of art for online auctions.

Larkins paintings gained national attention with Spacescapes, a continuing series of paintings celebrating America's achievements in space. She researched these paintings by working directly with astronauts, such as General Thomas P. Stafford and Admiral Richard Truly, and scientists at NASA and Jet Propulsion Laboratory (JPL).

== Awards and distinctions ==
Larkin received a special commendation from the Governor of Hong Kong and the U.S. Consulate for special contributions toward East-West cultural understanding. In 1976, she was a lecturer at the Smithsonian Institution on Modern Chinese Art, a field in which she has gained acknowledged scholarship. She was awarded the National Endowment for the Arts Artist Fellowship in 1981. She later was chosen to participate in the NASA Art Program, in which the agency commissioned artists to document the U.S. Space Program.

== Personal life ==
In 1971, Larkin married Richard Lacey, who died three years later, in 1974. In 2012, she retired in Palm Beach, Florida, where she lived until her death on November 21, 2018, aged 71.
