= Nina Czegledy =

Hungarian-born Canadian artist

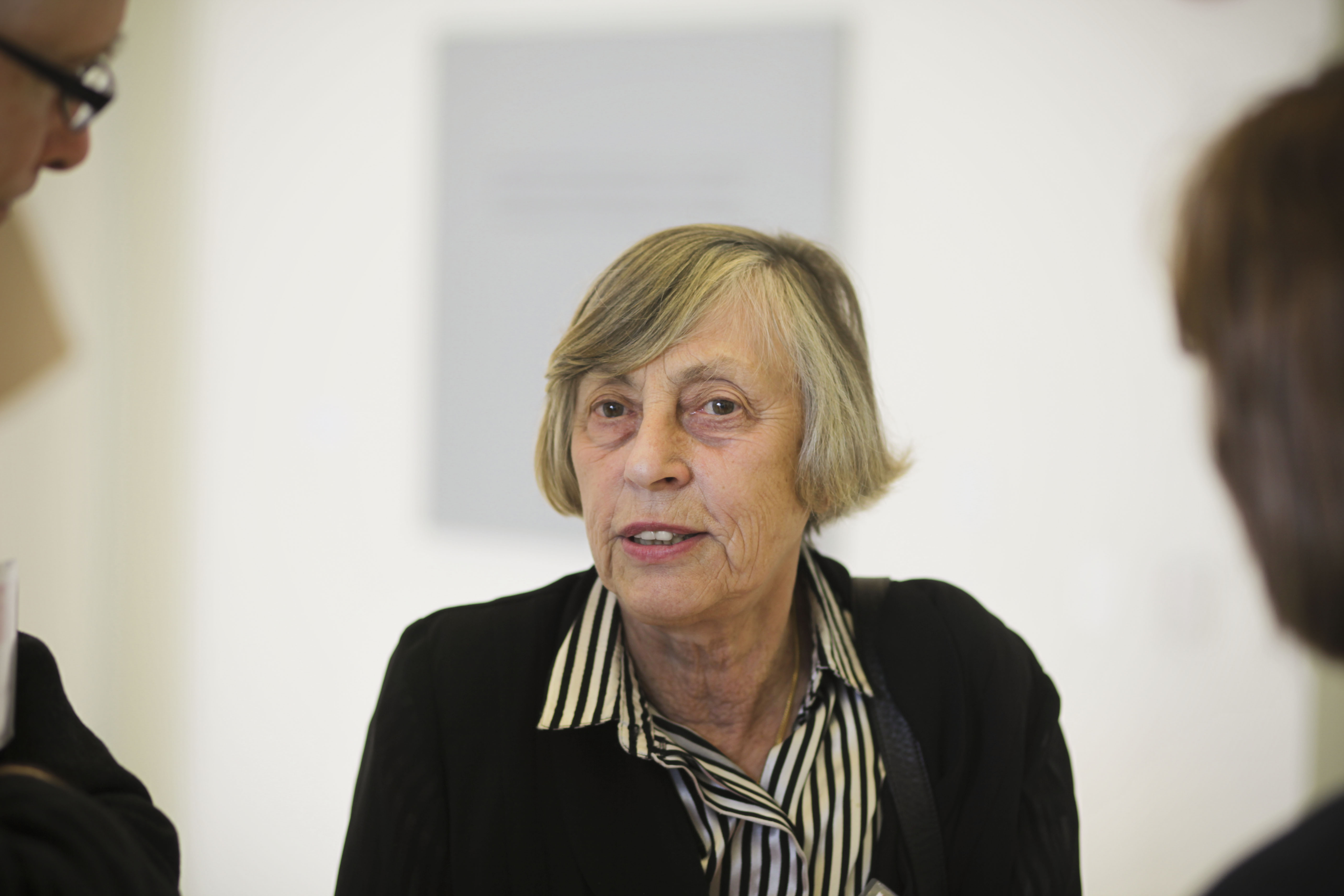
- Czegledy in 2010
- Born: Budapest, Hungary
- Occupations: Artist, writer

Nina Czegledy is a Canadian artist, new media art curator and writer.

== Life ==
Elinor Nina Czegledy (born in Budapest, Hungary) is based in Toronto, Canada. She is an interdisciplinary artist, curator and educator who works on art, science and technology collaborations around the world.

== Work ==
Czegledy's writing, art and curating explores the connection between art, science and the body.

Czegledy has curated numerous thematic exhibitions:

- SensoriaThe Art and Science of our Senses
- A Light Footprint in the Cosmos
- Dobble Debate
- Splice: at the Intersection of Art and Medicine
- Resonance the Electromagnetic Bodies Project
- Beyond Borders
- Aura/Aurora explored the Aurora Borealis form the perspectives of art, science and technology,
- Splice: at the Intersection of Art and Medicine[7][8]
- Digitized Bodies
- In Sight: Media Art From the Middle of Europe at YYZ gallery, Toronto,

Czegledy is an OCAD University Adjunct Professor, Research Fellow, KMDI, University of Toronto, Senior Fellow at the Hungarian University of Fine Arts, Honorary Fellow Moholy Nagy University of Art and Design, Budapest, Research Collaborator Hexagram International Network for Research Creation, Montreal. Board Member NOEMA Scientific Committee, Bologna, Italy an adjunct professor at Concordia University, and a member of the Leonardo/ISAST board and education forum., Co-Chair Leonardo/ISAST LASER talks, Chair, International Research Fellow, Intercreate Org, New Zealand, Member, Substantial Motion Research Network.

== Selected publications ==
- Czegledy, Nina; Czegledy, André P (2000). "Digitized bodies, virtual spectacles". Futures. 32 (2): 103–120. doi:10.1016/s0016-3287(99)00070-1.
- Czegledy, Nina (2003). "Bioelectromagnetism: discrete interpretations". Technoetic Arts. 1 (2): 135–141. doi:10.1386/tear.1.2.135.18693.
- "Auroral Myths vis-à-vis Science". 55th International Astronautical Congress of the International Astronautical Federation, the International Academy of Astronautics, and the International Institute of Space Law. American Institute of Aeronautics and Astronautics. 2004. doi:10.2514/6.IAC-04-IAA.6.16.1.02.
- Czegledy, Nina (2014). "Art as a Catalyst". Leonardo. 47 (5): 492. doi:10.1162/leon_a_00817. ISSN 0024-094X. S2CID 57562118.
