= Frank Malina =

American aeronautical engineer and painter (1912-1981)

Frank J. Malina
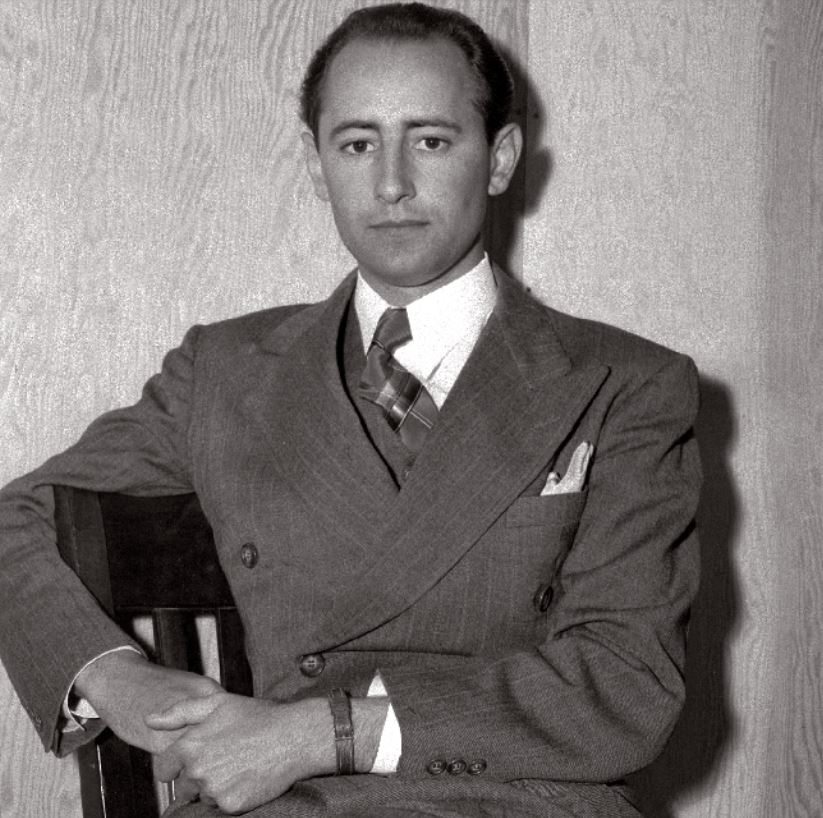
- Malina, c. 1950
- Born: Frank Joseph Malina; October 2, 1912; Brenham, Texas, U.S.
- Died: November 9, 1981 (aged 69); Paris, France
- Education: Texas A&M University (BS); California Institute of Technology (PhD)
- Scientific career
- Fields: Engineering
- Thesis: Characteristics of the rocket motor and flight analyses of the sounding rocket (1940)
- Doctoral advisor: Theodore von Kármán

Frank Joseph Malina (October 2, 1912 — November 9, 1981) was an American aeronautical engineer and painter, known for his pioneering work in early rocketry.

== Early life ==
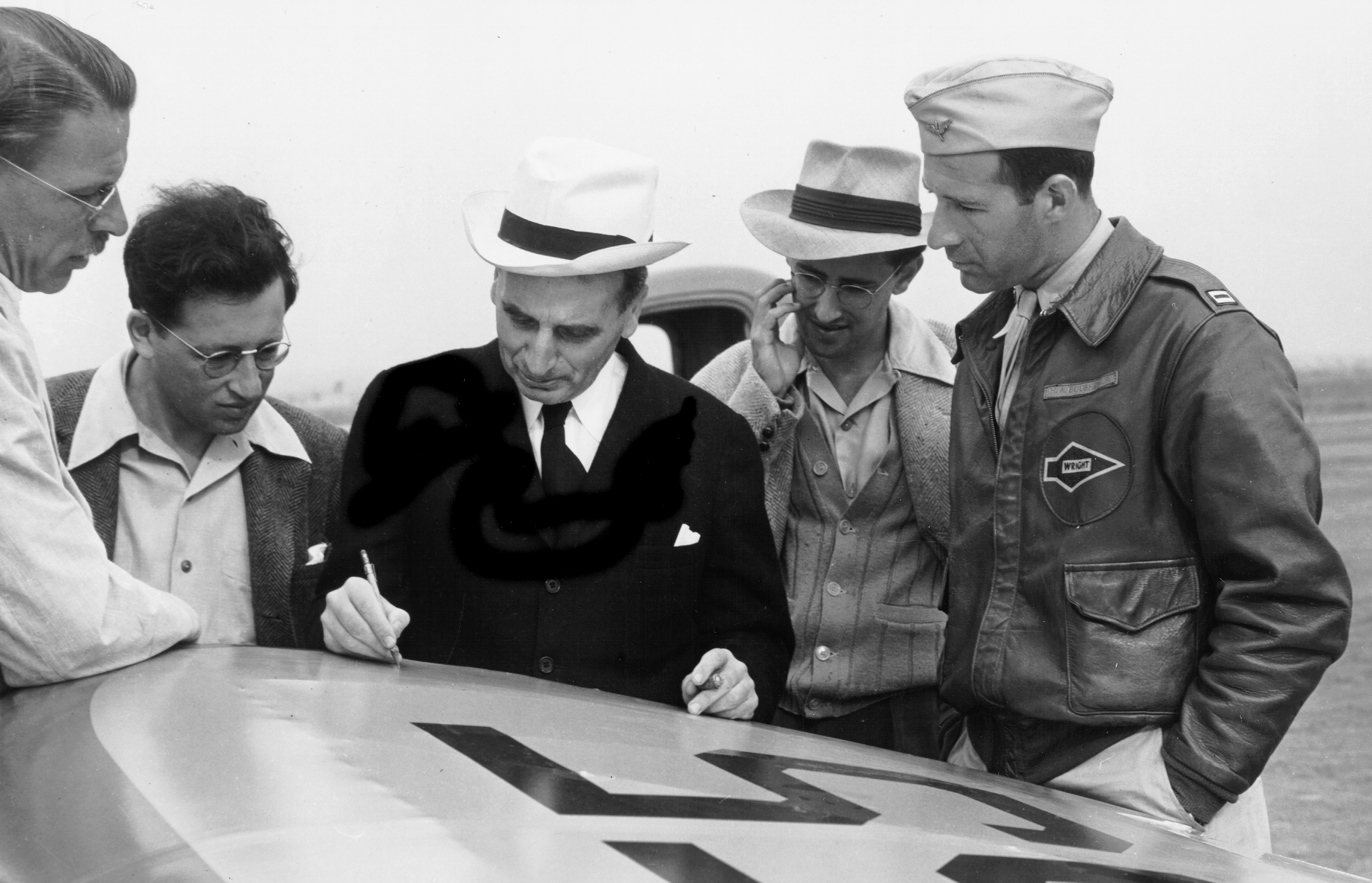
Malina (second from right) with Theodore von Kármán during his work on JATO in 1941

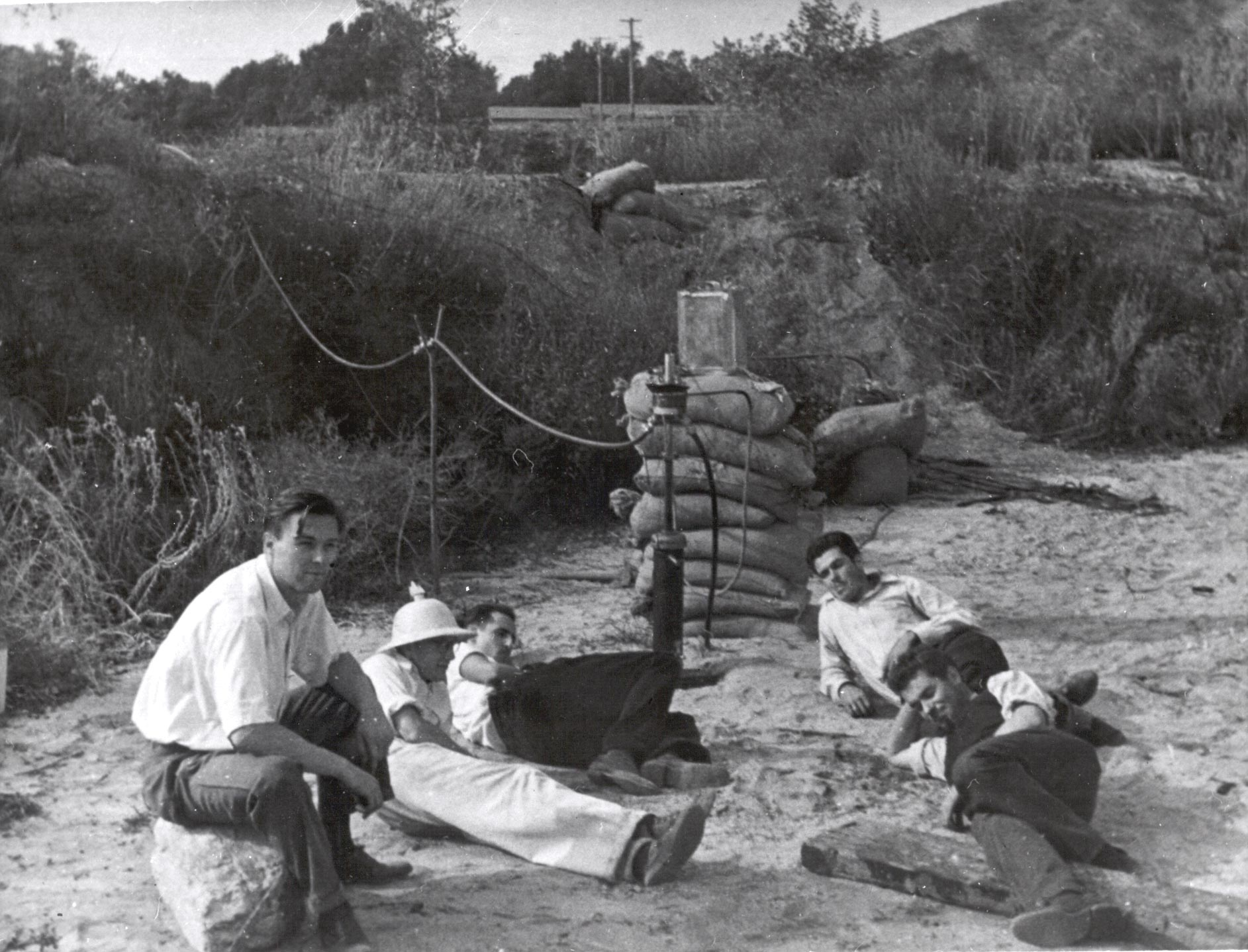
Seated left to right: Rudolph Schott, Apollo Milton Olin Smith, Frank Malina (white shirt, dark pants), Edward Forman and Jack Parsons (right, foreground). Nov. 15, 1936

Malina was born in Brenham, Texas. His father came from Moravia. Frank's formal education began with a degree in mechanical engineering from Texas A&M University in 1934. The same year he received a scholarship to study mechanical engineering at the California Institute of Technology (Caltech), where he obtained his doctoral degree in 1940.

In 1935, while a graduate student at Caltech, Malina persuaded Professor of Aeronautics Theodore von Kármán to allow him to pursue studies into rocketry and rocket propulsion. The formal goal was development of a sounding rocket.

Malina and five associates (including Jack Parsons and Qian Xuesen) became known at Caltech as the "Suicide Squad" because of their dangerous experiments (and failures) when testing rocket motor designs.

Malina's group was forced to move their operations away from the main Caltech campus into the more remote Arroyo Seco. This site and the research Malina was conducting would later become the Jet Propulsion Laboratory (JPL). Malina served as the second Director of JPL.

In 1939, the Société astronomique de France (French Astronomical Society) awarded Malina the Prix d'Astronautique for his contribution to the study of interplanetary travel and astronautics.

== Career ==
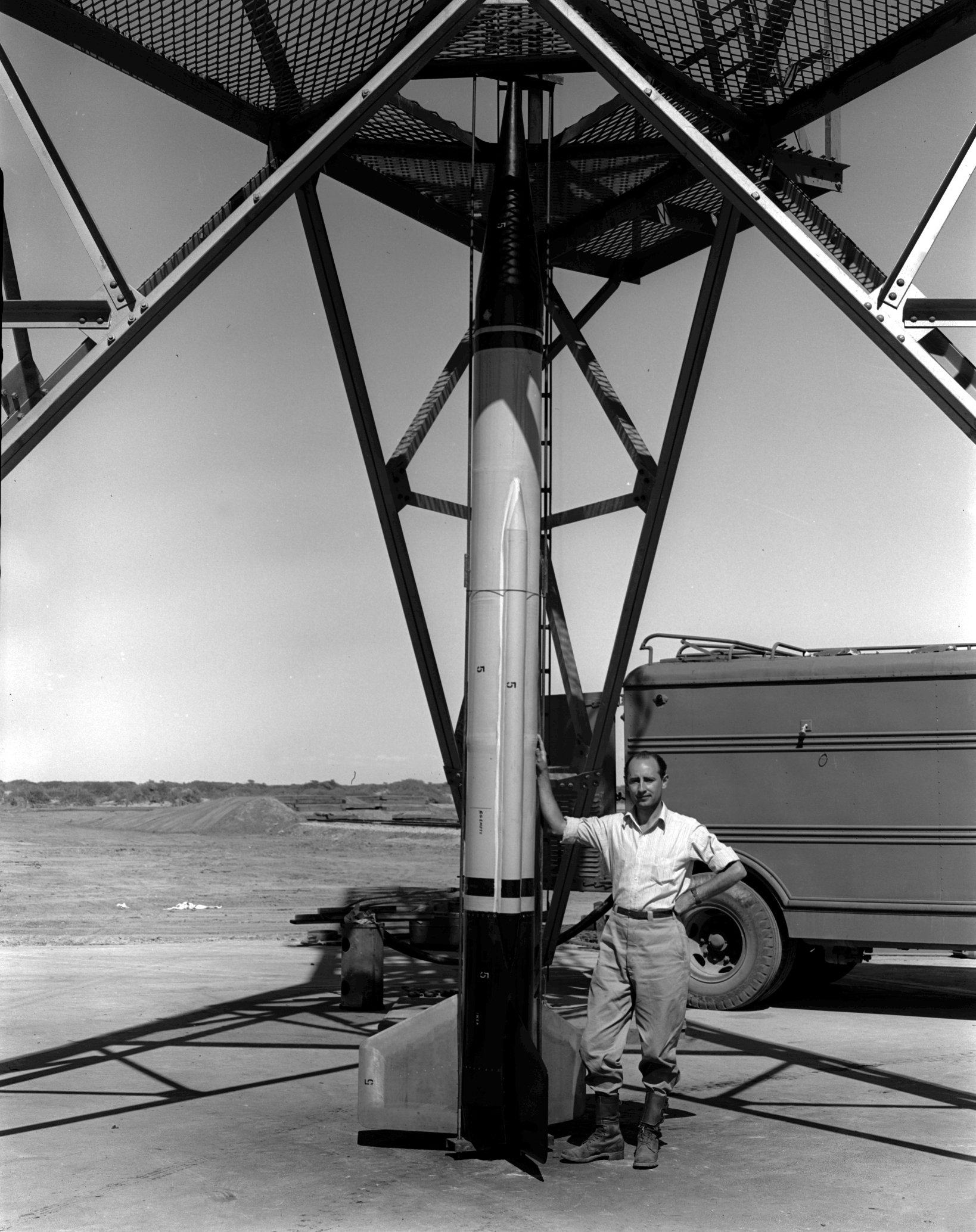
Malina and his fifth WAC Corporal, October 11, 1945

In 1942, von Kármán, Malina and three other students started the Aerojet Corporation.

By late 1945, Malina's rockets had outgrown the facility at Arroyo Seco, and his tests were moved to White Sands Missile Range in New Mexico. Here, the project's WAC Corporal sounding rocket was the first U.S. rocket to break the 50-mile altitude mark, becoming the first sounding rocket to reach space.

During 1947, with rocket research in high gear, Malina's demanding travel and administrative schedule, along with a dislike of so much rocketry research being devoted to weapons systems and not scientific research, caused him to re-evaluate his career and leave Aerojet. Malina's interest in the Communist Party, Caltech's "Unit 122," and labor activism while he was a graduate student in the 1930s had also attracted the attention of the FBI. However, there is "scant evidence" that Unit 122 or its "communist offshoot" ever passed rocket information to the Soviet Union in the 1930s or 1940s. ("The surveillance of suspected 'communists' hardly ever revealed espionage and served mainly to feed prejudice.")

He moved to France and joined the fledgling United Nations as secretariat of the United Nations Educational, Scientific and Cultural Organization (UNESCO) under Julian Huxley. In 1951, Malina became head of UNESCO's division of scientific research. Two years later, Malina left UNESCO to pursue an interest in kinetic art. In 1952, at the height of the Red Scare, Malina was indicted for having failed to list his Communist Party membership on an old security questionnaire from Caltech. He was declared a fugitive, to be arrested if and when he returned to the United States.

In 1968 in Paris he founded Leonardo, an international peer-reviewed research journal that featured articles written by artists on their own work, and focused on the interactions between the contemporary arts with the sciences and new technologies. The Leonardo journal is still published as of 2023 as a project of Leonardo/ISAST, the International Society for the Arts, Sciences and Technology.

In 1990, Malina was inducted into the International Space Hall of Fame.

== Family and death ==
Malina married twice. In 1939, he married Liljan Darcourt, a daughter of French Catholic immigrants; they divorced in 1945 (she later married advertising executive Lester Wunderman). Frank Malina died in 1981 in Boulogne-Billancourt, near Paris, France. His widow Marjorie Duckworth Malina died in 2006. Their sons Roger and Alan Malina live and work in the Dallas, TX area and Portugal, respectively.

== Literature ==
- Fraser MacDonald: Escape From Earth: A Secret History of The Space Race. PublicAffairs, New York, 2019, ISBN 978-1-61039-871-8

== See also ==
- Guggenheim Aeronautical Laboratory
- Qian Xuesen (H.S. Tsien)

== References and notes ==
Academic offices
Preceded by Theodore von Kármán	2nd Director of the Jet Propulsion Laboratory; 1944 – 1946	Succeeded by Louis Dunn
