= NASA Art Program =

The NASA Fine Art Program was established in 1962. NASA administrator, James Webb, jump-started the program by recommending artists to become involved in the agency. Artists, including Norman Rockwell, Robert Rauschenberg, Malcolm H. Smith and Andy Warhol were commissioned to record the history of space exploration through the eyes of artists. The first director of the Art Program was James Dean. Using artists of different mediums and genres serves the purpose of educating different audiences about NASA and space exploration. To give the artists the best experience possible, NASA allowed them unprecedented access to sites and materials. Participants were present at suit-up, launch sites, and press releases. All works, from sketches to finished products, were given to NASA for use in museums and exhibitions. The collection now includes 2,500 works by more than 350 artists. The program still exists today but is much smaller.

== How the program began ==
James Webb, an administrator from 1961 to 1968, put the program into effect. Webb wanted to use art to capture the emotions and importance of what NASA was doing. James Dean (an artist and NASA employee) became the head of the program with the help of Hereward Lester Cooke, a curator at the National Gallery of Art. To ensure that the program would succeed, Cooke looked at similar programs that the air force had and decided that the program needed three things done: Use only commissioned artists, keep all of the sketches that the artists drew while they were observing, and give artists an idea of how to represent NASA, but still let them create whatever they wanted.

== Major events ==
=== Project Mercury ===
Artists first time observing a mission was the last Mercury launch, with Gordon Cooper's Faith 7. Robert McCall, Mitchell Jamieson, Peter Hurd, John McCoy, Lamar Dodd, Paul Calle and Robert Shore were the first group of artists chosen. Each artists was paid $800 for their services as well as the freedom to create whatever they wanted. The art created during the last Mercury launch made it possible for the program to continue.

=== Apollo 11 mission ===
In July 1969 the program had its biggest event. It captured the attention of the public so, the number of artists grew. Mission Control at NASA's Johnson Space Center in Houston and NASA's Kennedy Space Center in Florida are just two of the locations artist chose to observe. Soon after the mission, the director of the National Art gallery asked Dean to use the art created during the mission.

== Artists involved ==
- Anderson, Laurie— Music performance artist, The End of the Moon (2004)
- Belbruno, Edward - Starscape Over Mountains on Another World
- Breteau, Patrice
- Cavallaro, Vincent — Painter, sculptor and abstract artist
- Cunningham, James - Abstract paintings
- E.V. Day, Sculptor - "Wheel of Optimism.
- Freeman, Fred- Saturn Blockhouse
- Hancock, Theodore
- Hoffman, Martin - Sunrise Suit Up
- Larkin, Sara — Painter, "Spacescapes"
- Leibovitz, Annie — Photographer
- Levy, Ellen- Space Chrysalis, 1985
- Luzak, Dennis — Painter
- Massimino, John — Artist
- Nelson, John — Space Visitor, 1986
- Pearce, John — Photographer
- Perlmutter, Jack- Moon, Horizon & Flowers (Rocket Rollout)
- Rauschenberg, Robert — Hot Shot, a montage chronicling the flight of a space shuttle
- Riley, Terry and the Kronos Quartet — Music Composition
- Rockwell, Norman— "Astronauts on the Moon"
- Schmidt, Charles - "Spacelab 1", "The Moon Suit"
- Smith H. Malcolm - F1 Test Stands
- Solie, John- Servicing Hubble
- Thon, William- Space Age Landscape
- Warhol, Andy - Moonwalk 1
- Wyeth, James - Gemini Launch Pad
- Zeller, Daniel - Titan

=== First group of commissioned artists ===
- Calle, Paul - Designer of the 1969 stamp commemorating the first crewed Moon landing.
- Dodd, Lamar
- Hurd, Peter- Sky Lab
- Jamieson, Mitchell- First Steps
- McCall, Robert
- McCoy, John
- Shore, Robert

== Personnel ==
- Bertram Ulrich — Curator
- Robert Schulman — Director, NASA Art Program, (1975 - 1994)
- James Dean (NASA) — Founding Director, NASA Art Program, 1962-1974

== Selected bibliography ==
- Visions of Flight: a retrospective from the NASA Art Collection; Schulman, Robert; National Aeronautics and Space Administration, Washington D.C; 1988
- Artistry of Space: the NASA art program; James Dean, Robert Schulman, Bertram Ulrich; Artrain USA, Ann Arbor, MI; 1999
- NASA & the Exploration of Space : with works from the NASA art collection; Roger D Launius, Bertram Ulrich; Stewart, Tabori & Chang; New York, NY; 1998
