= Paul Calle =

American artist

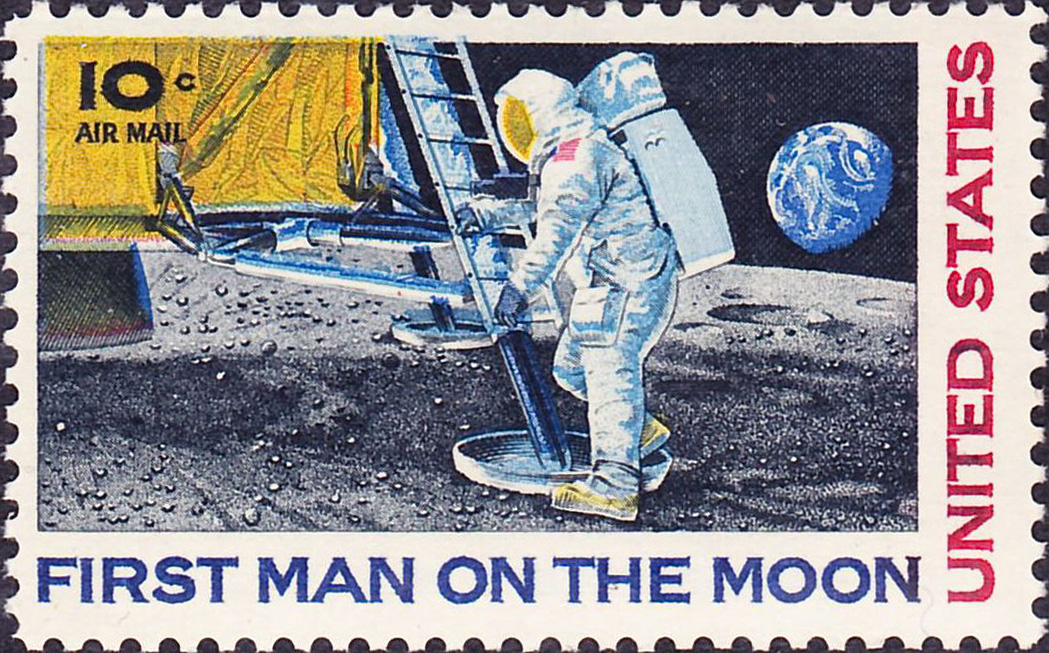
- Born: March 3, 1928; Manhattan, New York
- Died: December 30, 2010 (aged 82); Stamford, Connecticut
- Education: Pratt Institute
- Known for: Space art, sketching, postage stamps
- Spouse: Olga Calle (Until her death in 2003)

Paul Calle (pronounced KAL-ee; March 3, 1928 – December 30, 2010) was an American artist who was best known for the designs he created for postage stamps, including 40 that were released by the United States Postal Service, and others for stamps issued by the Federated States of Micronesia, the Marshall Islands, Sweden and the United Nations. The sole artist hired by NASA to cover the Apollo 11 astronauts up close, Calle designed the 10-cent stamp that commemorated the first crewed Moon landing; it depicted an astronaut stepping onto the Moon from the lunar module, with the Earth visible over the Moon's horizon.

== Biography ==
=== Education and early career ===
Calle was born on March 3, 1928, in the Manhattan borough of New York City and earned his undergraduate degree from Pratt Institute. He served in the United States Army during the Korean War, doing illustration work. Returning to the United States, Calle's early career included designing magazine covers for The Saturday Evening Post as well as for a series of science fiction publications.

=== Work at NASA ===
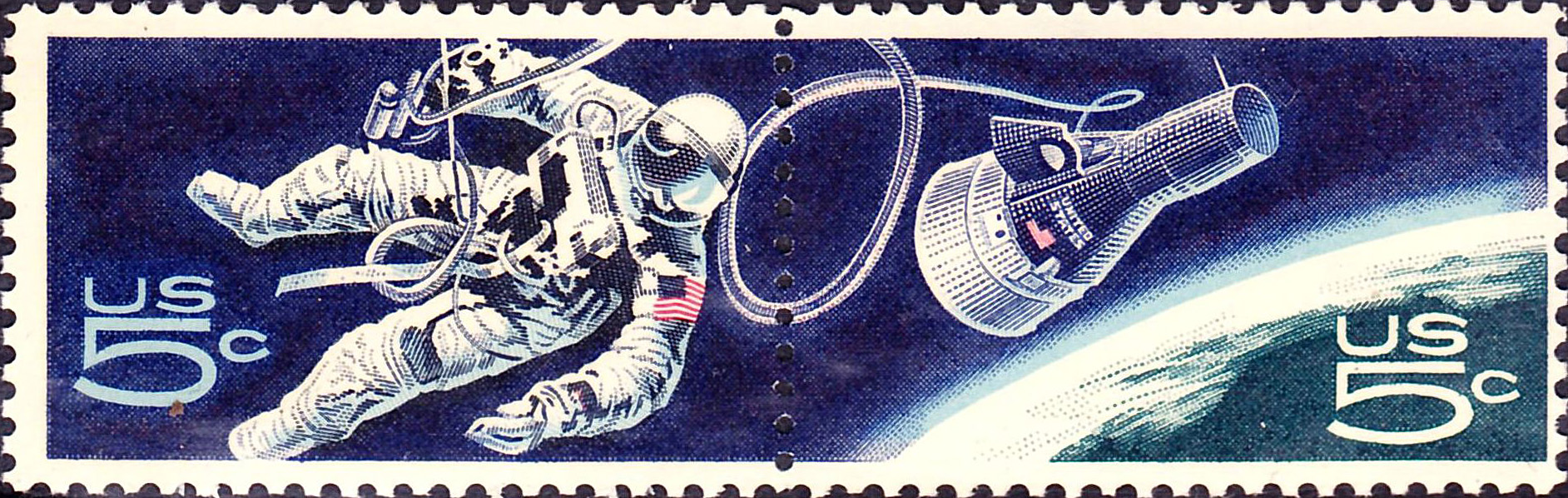
Calle's 1967 design commemorating astronaut Ed White's making the first American spacewalk, during the 1965 Gemini 4 mission.

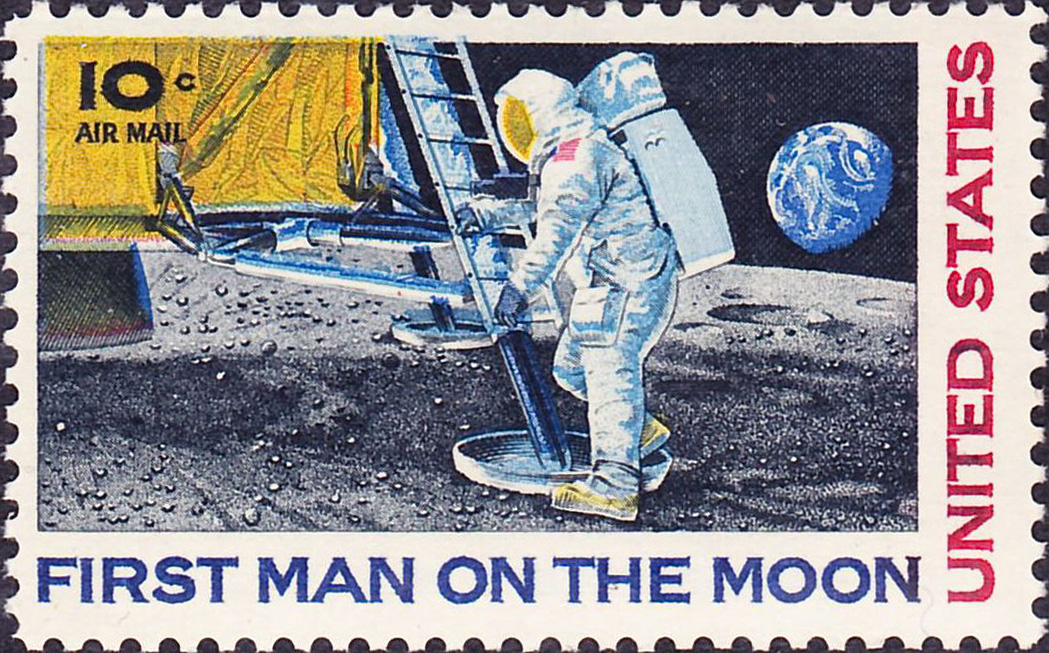
Stamp designed by Calle commemorating the first human Moon landing and issued on September 9, 1969.

In 1962, Calle was among the first group selected to participate in the NASA Art Program. Calle contributed a pair of complementary five-cent stamps issued in 1967 as part of the Accomplishments in Space Commemorative Issue, with the right stamp showing the Gemini 4 space capsule with the Earth's horizon as a backdrop, while the left stamp showed astronaut Ed White making the first American spacewalk. His best-known stamp was designed to mark the first human Moon landing and was issued in September 1969, showing an astronaut stepping out onto the surface of the Moon. The Apollo 11 crew carried with them a die proof of Calle's Moon-landing stamp, which was hand canceled by the astronauts while on the mission. Calle had been given exclusive access to be with the astronauts on July 16, 1969, while they made their final preparations for the Apollo 11 mission. The sketches he made based on his experiences that day have been displayed at the National Air and Space Museum and at the National Gallery of Art. Together with his son Chris, Calle returned to the subject of space exploration with a pair of stamps issued in 1994 in honor of the 25th anniversary of the Apollo 11 mission and the first human Moon landing.

=== Works ===
Calle produced dozens of postage stamp designs, featuring such individuals as Douglas MacArthur and Robert Frost. He also produced Western-themed artworks that have been shown at the National Cowboy & Western Heritage Museum, as well as a 1981 stamp honoring Frederic Remington. His depictions of the American West have been included in the collections of the Gilcrease Museum in Tulsa, Oklahoma and at the Booth Western Art Museum in Cartersville, Georgia.

=== Health, later life, and death ===
After doctors discovered that his melanoma had metastasized, he was placed on intravenous Ipilimumab, an experimental treatment being tested by Bristol-Myers Squibb that is meant to improve the response by the immune system to fight cancer. An initial course of treatment with the test drug combined with chemotherapy left no trace of the cancer in his body. A resident of Stamford, Connecticut, Calle died there at the age of 82 on December 30, 2010, of melanoma. He was survived by a daughter, two sons and six grandchildren. His wife Olga died in 2003; they had been married for more than 50 years.
