= Roger Malina =

American physicist and astronomer

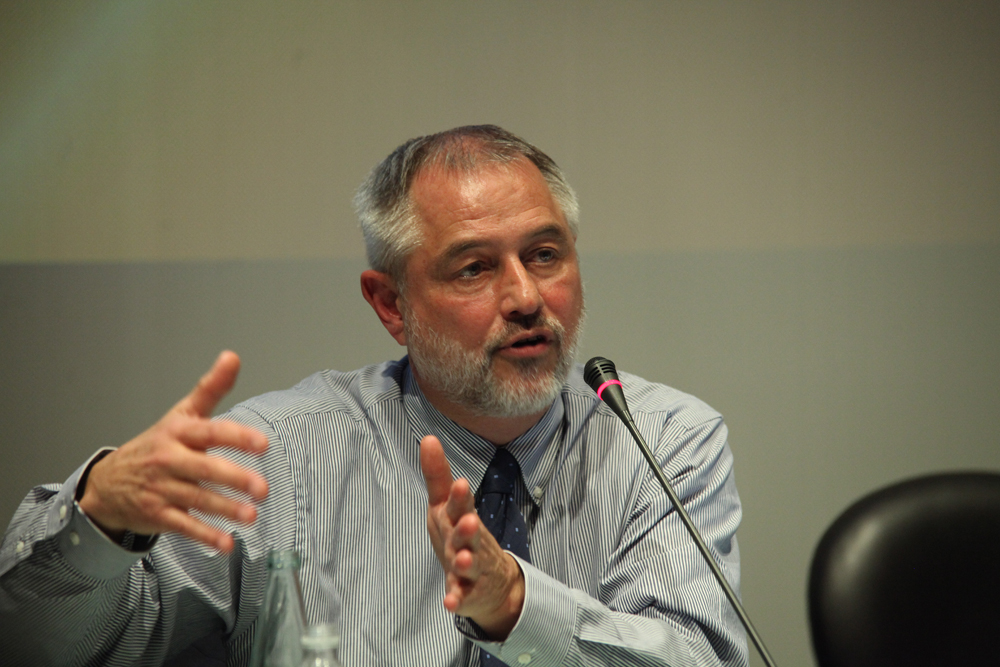
- Roger Malina in 2010
- Born: July 6, 1950 (age 75)
- Citizenship: United States
- Education: Massachusetts Institute of Technology; University of California, Berkeley
- Spouse: Christine Maxwell (m. 1986)
- Children: 3
- Father: Frank Malina

Roger Malina (born July 6, 1950) is an American physicist, astronomer, Executive Editor of Leonardo Publications by Leonardo, the International Society of Arts, Sciences and Technology (published by MIT Press) and distinguished professor of arts and technology, and professor of physics at the University of Texas at Dallas.

== Education and career ==
Malina obtained his Bachelor of Science in physics from Massachusetts Institute of Technology in 1972, and his Ph.D. in astronomy from the University of California, Berkeley, in 1979. He was principal investigator for the NASA Extreme Ultraviolet Explorer Satellite at the University of California, Berkeley. He is former director of the Observatoire Astronomique de Marseille Provence (OAMP) and of the Laboratoire d'Astrophysique de Marseille in Marseille, and member of its observational cosmology group, which investigates the nature of dark matter and dark energy.

Malina is president of the Association Leonardo in France, which fosters connections between the arts, sciences and technology, and has been the editor-in-chief of Leonardo magazine at MIT Press since 1982. He is also member of the Mediterranean Institute for Advanced Study (Institut Méditerranéen de Recherches Avancées, IMERA), which he has helped to set up and which aims at contributing to interdisciplinarity and which places emphasis on the human dimensions of the sciences. He is member of the jury for the Buckminster Fuller Challenge 2011.

Malina serves on the Advisory Council of METI (Messaging Extraterrestrial Intelligence). In 2011, Malina was appointed as distinguished professor of art and technology and professor of physics at the University of Texas at Dallas, where he commenced teaching in Spring 2012. His specialty in astrophysics is space instrumentation. His current work focuses on connections between science and art.

== Personal life ==
Malina is the son of Frank Malina, who was a research engineer in rocket propulsion, second director of the NASA Jet Propulsion Laboratory, and kinetic artist and founder of Leonardo Journal.

In 1986, Malina married British Internet content pioneer and educator Christine Maxwell. They have three children, sons Xavier (born 1988) and Yuri (born 1990) and daughter Giselle (born 1991).

== Publications ==
Books

- Stuart Bowyer and Roger F. Malina (eds.): Astrophysics in the Extrême Ultraviolet, Kluwer Academic Publishers, 1996, ISBN 978-0-7923-3908-3
- Roger F. Malina and Stuart Bowyer (eds.): Extreme Ultraviolet Astronomy, Pergamon Press, 1991.
- Jürgen Claus, "Roger F. Malina", in: "Liebe die Kunst. Eine Autobiografie in einundzwanzig Begegnungen", Kerber/ZKM, 2013, pp. 204–217. ISBN 978-3-86678-788-9
