= Leonardo, the International Society for the Arts, Sciences and Technology =

American nonprofit organization

Leonardo, The International Society for the Arts, Sciences and Technology (Leonardo/ISAST) is a registered 501(c)(3) nonprofit formed in 1982 as an umbrella organization for the journals Leonardo and the Leonardo Music Journal. In 2018, Leonardo/ISAST was awarded the Golden Nica Prix Ars Electronica as Visionary Pioneers of New Media Art.

== History ==
Leonardo/ISAST was founded by physicist Roger Malina, son of the Leonardo journal's founder, astronautical pioneer and artist Frank Malina. With the support of founding board members like Frank Oppenheimer, the International Society for the Arts, Sciences and Technology (Leonardo/ISAST) was formed in 1982. The name "Leonardo" was inspired by Leonardo da Vinci, due to his contributions to art, science, and technological progress.

== Publications ==
Leonardo/ISAST aims include to provide international education and charitable assistance to artists; promote and develop the interaction of artists, scientists, and engineers through conferences, exhibitions, workshops, seminars and other events.

Publications of ISAST include the following, published through The MIT Press:

- Leonardo
- Leonardo Music Journal
- Leonardo Electronic Almanac, editor-in-chief Lanfranco Aceti
- Leonardo Book Series, editor-in-chief Sean Cubitt
- Leonardo Reviews, editor-in-chief Michael Punt

Programs of ISAST include:

- Leonardo ABstracts Service (LABS), editor-in-chief Sheila Pinkel
- LASER (Leonardo Art Science Evening Rendezvous) international speaker series chaired by Piero Scaruffi
- Scientific Delirium Madness artist-scientist residency with Djerassi Artists Residency Program
- Leonardo Education and Art Forum (LEAF), chaired by Ruth West; past chairs include Patricia Olynyk and Ellen Levy.

== Governance ==
Leonardo/ISAST is currently governed by Marc Hebert, Raphael Arar, Michael Bennett, Alan Boldon, Nina Czegledy, Adiraj Gupta, Minu Ipe, Gordon Knox, Roger Malina, Joel Slayton, Timothy Summers, Darlene Tong, and Sha Xin Wei.
