= Mitchell Jamieson =

American artist (1915–1976)

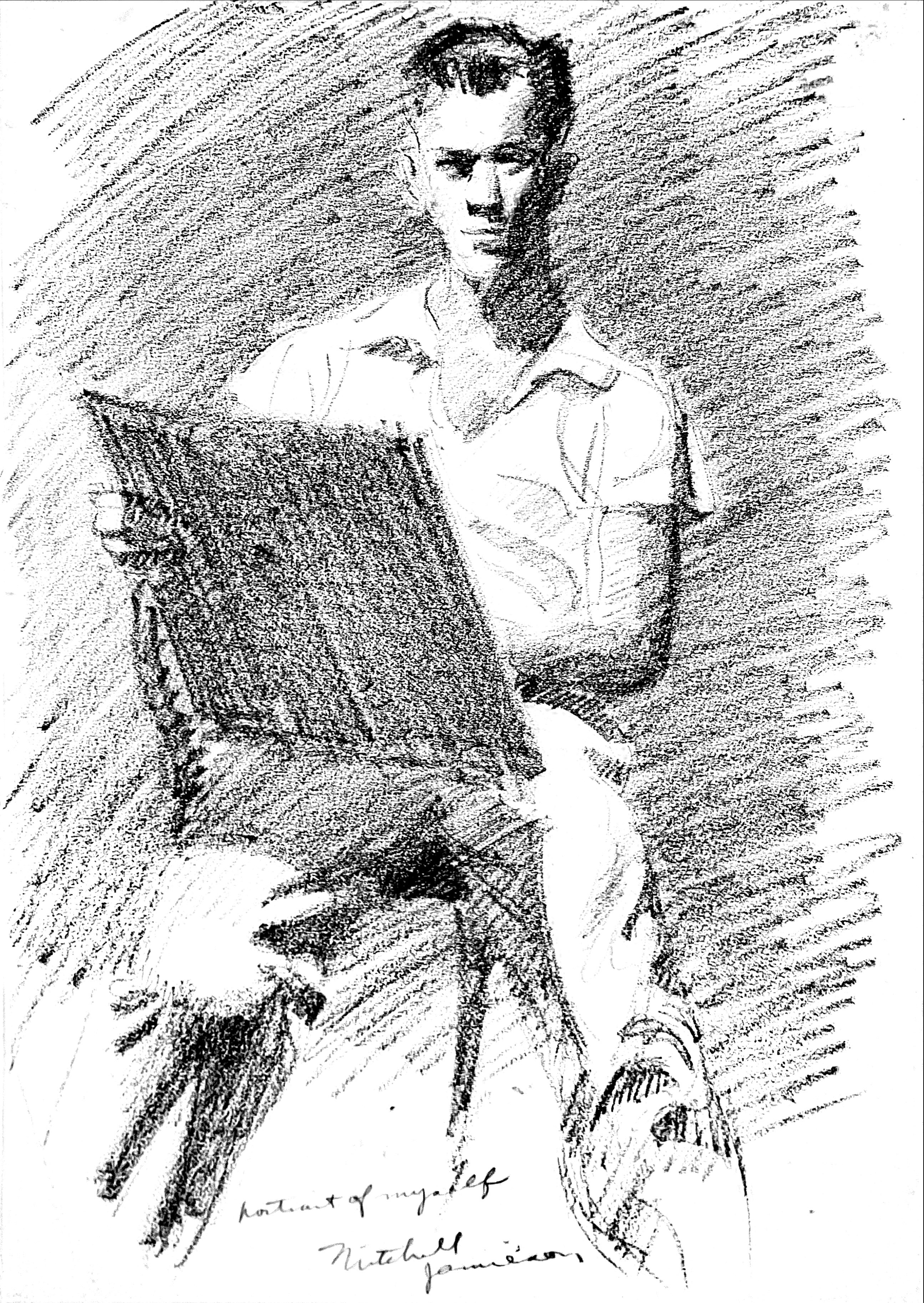
- 1930s self-portrait in Charlotte Amalie, US Virgin Islands.
- Born: 1915; Kensington, Maryland, U.S.
- Died: February 4, 1976 (aged 60–61); Alexandria, Virginia, U.S.
- Spouse: Ludmilla A. Jamieson

Mitchell Jamieson (1915–1976) was an American painter who worked for the Federal Art Project during the Great Depression, before studying painting in Mexico and returning to the United States. In World War II he enlisted as a war artist for the United States Navy, receiving a lieutenant's commission and a Bronze Star. After the war he worked as a professor of art and continued to travel and paint prolifically.

During his extraordinary career he began depicting the infrastructure projects of Franklin D. Roosevelt's New Deal. Always more drawn to people, however, his studies in Mexico and work as a World War II war artist led him to portray the Americans in their crusade against the Axis powers. Afterwards he was a pioneering artist in the NASA Art Program before and after his devastating work chronicling the impact of the Vietnam War on the peoples of Southeast Asia in his series "The Plague." These efforts took a psychological toll on him. Broken by his Vietnam experiences, he died by his own hand in 1976.

Jamieson was twice awarded a Guggenheim Fellowship. His works are on display at the White House, National Air and Space Museum, the National Gallery of Art, The Smithsonian, Naval History and Heritage Command, Corcoran Gallery of Art, Metropolitan Museum of Art, Brooklyn Museum, Whitney Museum of American Art, the Seattle Art Museum and in numerous other collections.

== Life ==
Jamieson was born in Kensington, Maryland, in 1915. He studied at the Abbott Art School and the Corcoran School of Art. He married Ludmilla Plavsky in 1946 and had a son. They remained married until his death.

== The WPA Federal Art Project ==
In the 1930s, Jamieson traveled first to Key West, then on to the United States Virgin Islands to paint under the Treasury Department's Art Project. Residing at Blackbeard's Castle in Charlotte Amalie, he painted island life while a guest of the island's government architect, honing his skills before moving to Mexico City, where in 1939 he studied mural painting.

Before and after his Mexican sojourn, Jamieson received commissions to paint murals for post offices in Upper Marlboro and Laurel, Maryland; and Willard, Ohio.

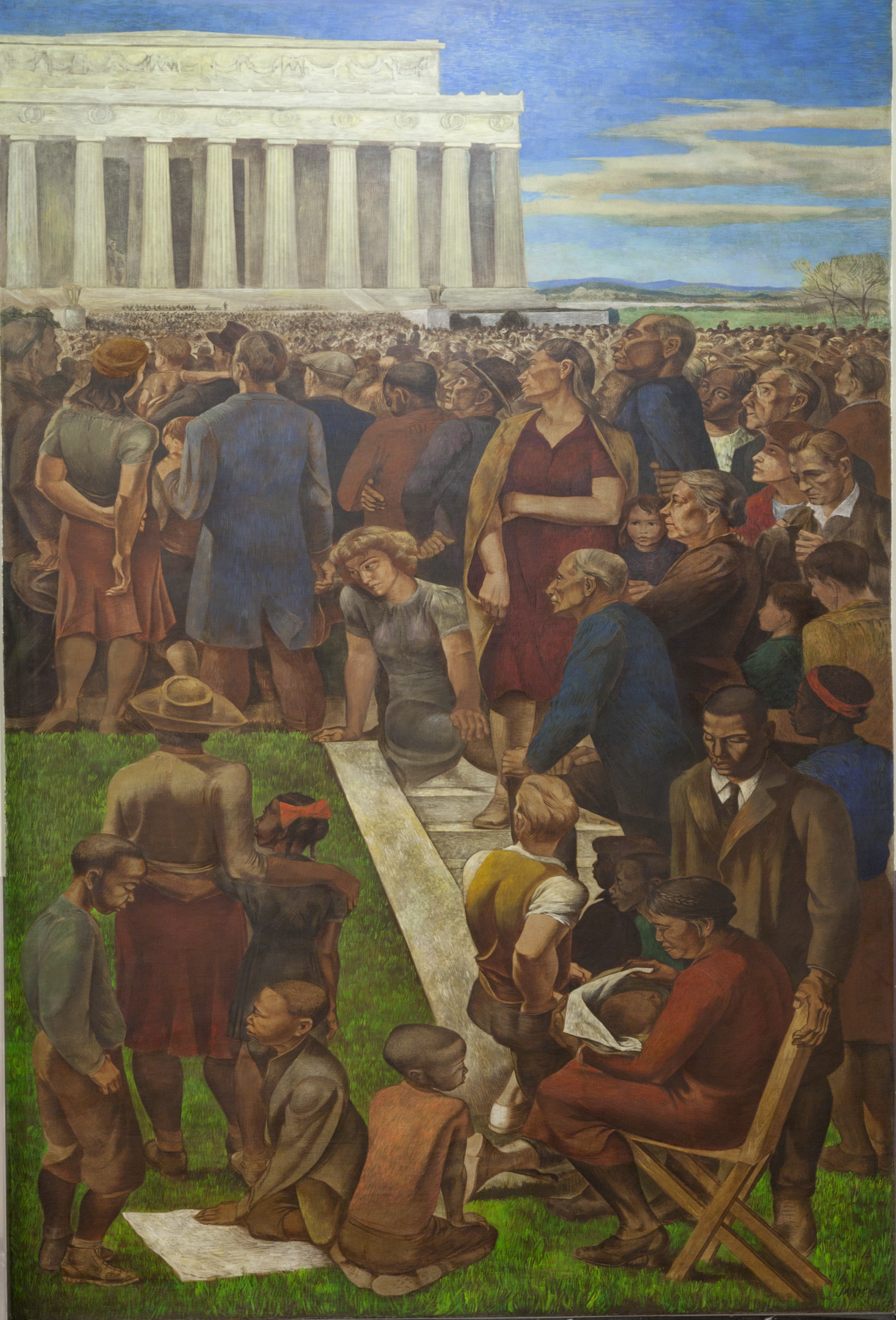
Mitchell Jamieson's 1943 mural An Incident in Contemporary American Life, at the United States Department of the Interior Building, depicts the scene of Marian Anderson's 1939 concert at the Lincoln Memorial

Jamieson received a major commission from Secretary of the Interior Harold L. Ickes to paint the mural in what is now the Stewart Lee Udall Department of the Interior Building to commemorate Marion Anderson's famous concert at the Lincoln Memorial on April 9, 1939. Titled An Incident in Contemporary American Life, the mural is still on view to the public who visit the building.

== World War II Combat Artist ==
During World War II, Jamieson served as a combat artist in the U.S. Navy. He sketched and painted the occupation on North Africa, the invasion of Sicily, the invasion of France, and the Okinawa invasion. Jamieson described his work as a war artist in the following terms:

"I have confined my paintings to what I have experienced and know to be strictly true, at the same time having to adapt my way of working to the pressure of time and swift-moving events. Yet anything that is worthwhile or that has the bite of reality in the work produced under these circumstances probably derives from a constant effort to share as fully as possible in the lives and experiences of others".

== Vietnam and "The Plague" ==
In 1967 Jamieson volunteered to artistically document the war in Vietnam. His depictions, which he called "The Plague" series, demonstrate Jamieson's disaffection with the war and complete disenchantment with war itself. According to the Naval History and Heritage Command,

"Unlike the mostly sympathetic images Jamieson made of the Second World War, the Vietnam works are angry and accusatory. The difference is due to Jamieson’s moral outrage towards the Vietnam War and his growing pessimism towards America. Some of these works are in the collection of the U.S. Army Center of Military History. Sadly, the depravity and inhumanity Jamieson witnessed in Vietnam and then depicted in The Plague series took its toll on the artist psychologically."

A set of the Plague series is in the permanent collection of the National Gallery of Art

== Mercury and Apollo Programs ==
Jamieson was the first artist chosen by NASA to document the Mercury Program and in 1963 documented the astronaut Gordon Cooper's historic twenty-two orbits around the earth.

NASA later called upon him to document the Apollo Program within the NASA Art Program, Jamieson created the Apollo 11 Codices, which are now in the permanent collection of the National Air and Space Museum.

== Death ==
Jamieson killed himself at his Northern Virginia home in 1976, nine years after returning from Vietnam. As journalist Paul Richard described the circumstances in the Washington Post:

"On Feb. 4, 1976, the artist Mitchell Jamieson shot himself to death in his house in Alexandria. There was something in his art, in his masterful yet hideous drawings of Vietnam, that pointed toward his suicide. Jamieson the hero, Jamieson the victim, had become at last another casualty of war.

Vietnam scarred us all, but it gnawed at Jamieson and would not let him heal. He spent less than a month there in 1967, but until the day he died he could not and he would not stop remembering and drawing the horrors he had seen and those he had dreamed.

Historians in the army sent him there to draw. They were sure that he could take it, for he'd been to war before. Jamieson saw action, in Africa and Sicily, on Utah Beach and Iwo Jima, as a Navy combat artist during World War II.

He drew his fellow GIs then as martyrs and crusaders. By the time he got to Vietnam he saw them as the plague."
