= Leonardo (journal) =

American peer-reviewed academic journal

- Discipline: Arts
- Language: English
- Edited by: Roger F. Malina

Publication details
- History: 1968–present
- Publisher: MIT Press for Leonardo, the International Society for the Arts, Sciences and Technology (United States)
- Frequency: 6/year (including Leonardo Music Journal)

Standard abbreviations
- ISO 4: Leonardo

Indexing
- ISSN: 0024-094X (print); 1530-9282 (web)
- JSTOR: 0024094X
- OCLC no.: 1755782

Links
- Journal homepage; Online access

Leonardo is a peer-reviewed academic journal published by the MIT Press covering the application of contemporary science and technology to the arts and music.

== History ==
The journal, Leonardo, was established in 1968 by artist and scientist Frank Malina in Paris, France. Since 1968, Leonardo has published writings by artists who work with science- and technology-based art media. Journal operations were moved to the San Francisco Bay Area by Frank's son Roger Malina, an astronomer and space scientist, who took over operations of the journal upon Frank Malina's death in 1981. In 1982, the International Society for the Arts Sciences and Technology (Leonardo/ISAST) was founded to further the aims of Leonardo by providing avenues of communication for artists working in contemporary media. The society also publishes Leonardo Music Journal, the Leonardo Electronic Almanac, Leonardo Reviews, and the Leonardo Book Series. All publications are produced in collaboration with the MIT Press.

Other activities of the organization include an awards program and participation in annual conferences and symposiums such as the Space and the Arts Workshop and the annual College Art Association conference. Leonardo has a sister organization in France, the Association Leonardo, that publishes the Observatoire Leonardo website. While encouraging the innovative presentation of technology-based arts, the society also functions as an international meeting place for artists, educators, students, scientists, and others interested in the use of new media in contemporary artistic expression.

The aims of the organization include the documentation of personal and innovative technologies developed by artists, similar to the way in which findings of scientists are documented in journal publications.

An example of scientific and technical studies interacting with those of art is the publication in Leonardo of the realization of significant historical precedence in physics being demonstrated among the pages of notes by Leonardo that went unnoticed until a physicist examined pages that traditionally have been the subject of review regarding his art. The physicist recognized that sketches by Leonardo in the margins documented experiments he conducted that explained gravity and explored its dynamics much earlier than those credited with the discoveries related to it, and his insight into the significance of Leonardo's graphic details of his experiment was published in the journal in 2023.

== See also ==
- New Media
- Caterina Verde, contributing artist
