= Alvania moolenbeeki =

Scientific classification
- Kingdom: Animalia
- Phylum: Mollusca
- Class: Gastropoda
- Subclass: Caenogastropoda
- Order: Littorinimorpha
- Superfamily: Rissooidea
- Family: Rissoidae
- Genus: Alvania
- Species: A. moolenbeeki

Binomial name
- Alvania moolenbeeki De Jong & Coomans, 1988

Species of gastropod

Alvania moolenbeeki is a species of minute sea snail, a marine gastropod mollusk or micromollusk in the family Rissoidae.

== Description ==
The length of the shell attains 1 mm. This species has a protoconch with a spiral design.

== Distribution ==
This species occurs in the Caribbean Sea off Aruba and Bonaire.
