= Spiral of Theodorus =

Polygonal curve made from right triangles

The spiral of Theodorus up to the triangle with a hypotenuse of $\sqrt{17}$

In geometry, the spiral of Theodorus (also called the square root spiral, Pythagorean spiral, or Pythagoras's snail) is a spiral composed of right triangles, placed edge-to-edge. It was named after Theodorus of Cyrene.

== Construction ==
The spiral is started with an isosceles right (angled) triangle, with each leg having unit length. It has a hypotenuse with length equal to the square root of 2. Then, another right triangle (which is the only automedian right triangle) is formed, with one leg being the hypotenuse of the prior right triangle and the other leg having a length of 1; the length of the hypotenuse of this second right triangle is the square root of 3. The process then repeats; the $n$th triangle in the sequence is a right triangle with the side lengths $\sqrt{n}$, $1$, and $\sqrt{n+1}$. For example, the 22nd triangle has sides measuring $1$,$\sqrt{22}$, and a hypotenuse of $\sqrt{22+1} = \sqrt{23}$.

== History and uses ==
Although all of Theodorus' work has been lost, Plato quoted some of his writing into the dialogue Theaetetus, which tells of Theodorus' ideas. It is believed that Theodorus had proved that all the square roots of integers from 3 to 17, excepting 4, 9, and 16, are irrational by means of the Spiral of Theodorus.

Plato does not attribute the proof of the irrationality of the square root of 2 to Theodorus, as it was well known before him. Theodorus and Theaetetus split the rational numbers and irrational numbers into different categories.

== Hypotenuse ==
Each of the triangles' hypotenuses $h_n$ gives the square root of the corresponding natural number plus one, with $h_1=\sqrt{2}$ and $h_n=\sqrt{n+1}$.

Plato, tutored by Theodorus, questioned why Theodorus stopped at $\sqrt{17}$. The reason is commonly believed to be that the $\sqrt{17}$ hypotenuse belongs to the last triangle which does not overlap the original unit triangle.

=== Overlapping ===
In 1958, Kaleb Williams proved that two hypotenuses will never overlap, no matter how far the spiral is continued. In addition, if a random side of unit length is extended into an infinite line, the line will never pass through any of the vertices in the spiral (excepting the two defining the line) .

== Extension ==
Colored extended Spiral of Theodorus with 110 triangles

Theodorus stopped his spiral at the 16th triangle with a hypotenuse of $\sqrt{17}$. However, if the spiral is continued indefinitely by adding triangles, more interesting characteristics can be found:

=== Growth rate ===
==== Angle ====
A triangle or section of spiral

If $\varphi_n$ is the angle of the $n$th triangle (or spiral segment), then:
$$\tan \varphi_n = \frac{1}{\sqrt{n}}$$
Therefore, the subtended angle $\varphi_n$ of the next triangle $n$ is exactly
$$\varphi_n=\arctan \frac{1}{\sqrt{n}}$$

For the 16-segment portion of the spiral constructed by Theodorus, the sum of the subtended angles is
$$\arctan \frac{1}{\sqrt{1}} + \arctan \frac{1}{\sqrt{2}} + \cdots + \arctan \frac{1}{\sqrt{16}}
\approx 6.128731 \text{ rad}
\approx 351.1504^\circ$$
and the subsequent addition of one more term $\arctan \tfrac{1}{\sqrt{17}}$ gives a sum of $\approx 364.783^\circ$, which exceeds a full turn, so that the triangles begin to overlap.

The sum of the angles of the first $k$ triangles is written as $\varphi(k)$. It grows proportionally to the square root of $k$, with a small bounded correction term $c_1(k)$
$$\varphi\left (k\right)
= \sum_{n=1}^k\varphi_n
= 2\sqrt{k} + c_1(k) + \frac{1}{6\sqrt{k}} - \frac{1}{120 k^{3/2}} + O(k^{-5/2})$$
where
$$\lim_{k \to \infty} c_1(k) = - 2.157782996659\ldots = K.$$
where $K$ denotes Hlawka's snail constant (OEIS: A105459).

The aforementioned constant can be computed by the rapidly convergent series
$$K = \sum_{m=0}^{\infty} \frac{(-1)^m \zeta\left(m + \frac{1}{2}\right)}{2m + 1}$$
where $\zeta(x)$ is the Riemann zeta function.

==== Radius ====
The stepwise growth of the radius of the spiral between triangles $n$ and $n+1$, is
$$\Delta r = \sqrt{n+1} - \sqrt{n} = \frac{1}{\sqrt{n+1}+\sqrt{n}} \sim \frac{1}{2\sqrt{n}}$$

=== Archimedean spiral ===
The Spiral of Theodorus approximates the Archimedean spiral whose polar equation is $r = \tfrac12(\theta - K)$. Just as the distance between two windings of this Archimedean spiral equals mathematical constant $\pi$, as the number of spins of the spiral of Theodorus approaches infinity, the distance between two consecutive windings quickly approaches $\pi$.

The following table shows successive windings of the spiral approaching π:

Winding No.:	Calculated average winding-distance	Accuracy of average winding-distance in comparison to π
2	3.1592037	99.44255%
3	3.1443455	99.91245%
4	3.14428	99.91453%
5	3.142395	99.97447%
$\to\infty$	$\to\pi$	$\to 100\%$

As shown, after only the fifth winding, the distance is a 99.97% accurate approximation to $\pi$.

== Continuous curve ==
Philip J. Davis' analytic continuation of the Spiral of Theodorus, including extension in the opposite direction from the origin (negative nodes numbers).

The question of how to interpolate the discrete points of the spiral of Theodorus by a smooth curve was proposed and answered by Philip J. Davis in 2001 by analogy with Euler's formula for the gamma function as an interpolant for the factorial function. Davis found the function
$$T(x) = \prod_{k=1}^\infty \frac{1 + i/\sqrt{k}}{1 + i/\sqrt{x+k}} \qquad ( -1 < x < \infty )$$
which was further studied by his student Leader and by Iserles. This function can be characterized axiomatically as the unique function that satisfies the functional equation
$$f(x+1) = \left( 1 + \frac{i}{\sqrt{x+1} }\right) \cdot f(x),$$
the initial condition $f(0) = 1,$ and monotonicity in both argument and modulus.

An analytic continuation of Davis' continuous form of the Spiral of Theodorus extends in the opposite direction from the origin.

In the figure the nodes of the original (discrete) Theodorus spiral are shown as small green circles. The blue ones are those, added in the opposite direction of the spiral. Only nodes $n$ with the integer value of the polar radius $r_n=\pm\sqrt{|n|}$ are numbered in the figure. The dashed circle in the coordinate origin $O$ is the circle of curvature at $O$.

== See also ==
- Fermat's spiral
- List of spirals
