= Pitch angle of a spiral =

Property of spirals

The pitch angle α of a spiral

In the geometry of spirals, the pitch angle or pitch of a spiral is the angle made by the spiral with a circle through one of its points, centered at the center of the spiral. Equivalently, it is the complementary angle to the angle made by the vector from the origin to a point on the spiral, with the tangent vector of the spiral at the same point. Pitch angles are used to characterize the steepness of spirals, such as in astronomy to describe spiral galaxies.

Logarithmic spirals, for example, are characterized by the property that the pitch angle remains invariant for all points of the spiral. Two logarithmic spirals are congruent when they have the same pitch angle, but otherwise are not congruent. For instance, only the golden spiral has pitch angle
$$\arctan\left(\frac{\ln\varphi}{\pi/2}\right)\approx 17^\circ,$$
where $\varphi$ denotes the golden ratio; logarithmic spirals with other angles are not golden spirals.

Spirals that are not logarithmic have pitch angles that vary by distance from the center of the spiral. For an Archimedean spiral the angle decreases with the distance, while for a hyperbolic spiral the angle increases with the distance. The equation for determining pitch angle is,

$$\psi=\arctan\left( \frac{r}{\frac{dr }{d\theta}} \right)-\frac{\pi}{2}$$
