= Seashell surface =

Mathematical spiral-type surface

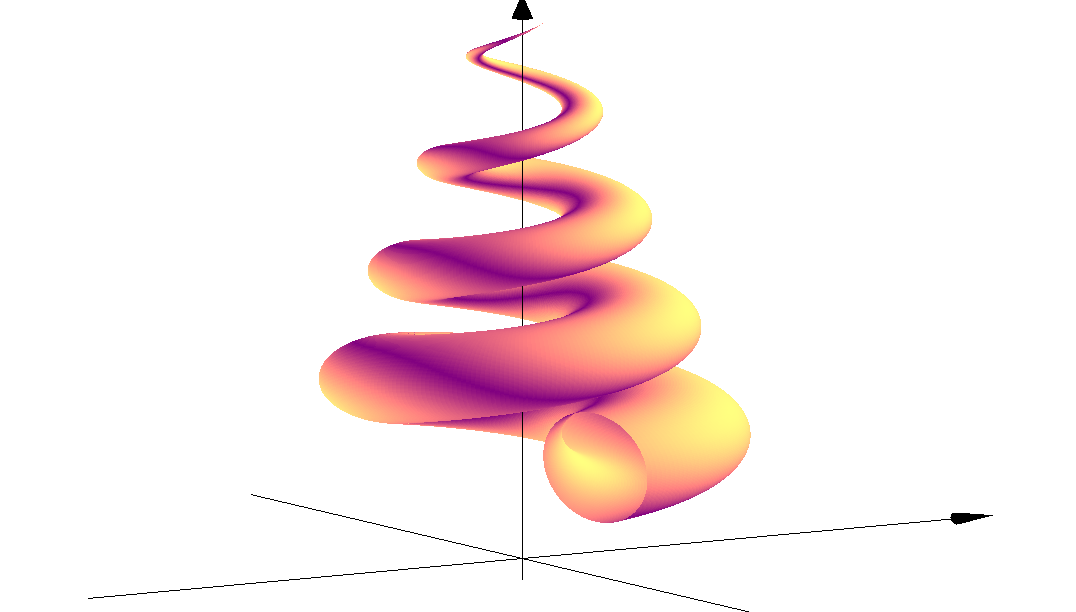
Seashell surface with parametrization on left

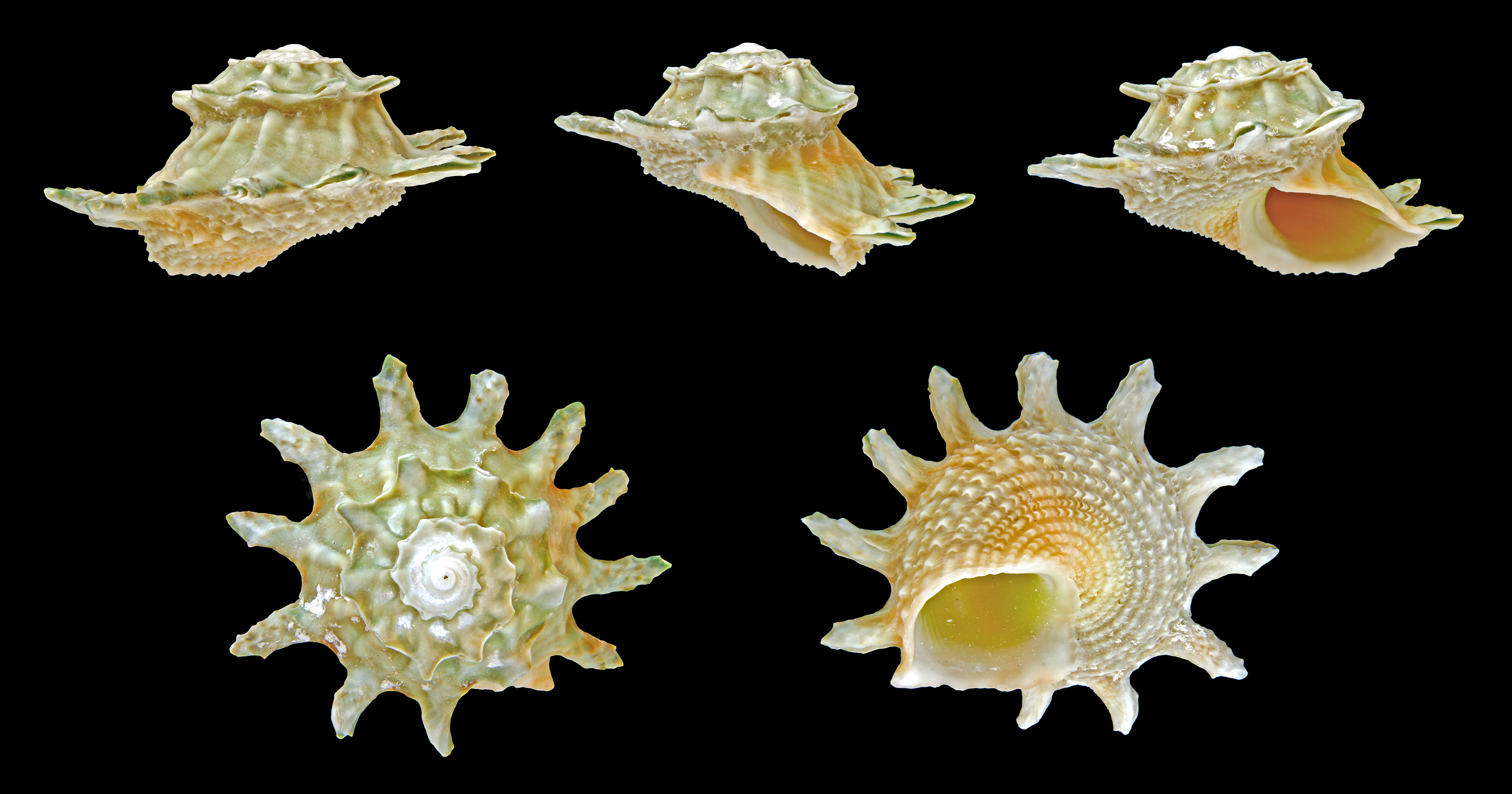
Wheel-like Star Shell Astralium calcar, Diameter 3,5 cm; Originating from the Philippines

In mathematics, a seashell surface is a surface made by a circle which spirals up the z-axis while decreasing its own radius and distance from the z-axis. Not all seashell surfaces describe actual seashells found in nature.

== Parametrization ==
The following is a parameterization of one seashell surface:

$$\begin{align}
x & {} = \frac{5}{4}\left(1-\frac{v}{2\pi}\right)\cos(2v)(1+\cos u)+\cos 2v \\  \\
y & {} = \frac{5}{4}\left(1-\frac{v}{2\pi}\right)\sin(2v)(1+\cos u)+\sin 2v \\  \\
z & {} = \frac{10v}{2\pi}+\frac{5}{4}\left(1-\frac{v}{2\pi}\right)\sin(u)+15
\end{align}$$

where $0\le u<2\pi$ and $-2\pi\le v <2\pi$\\

Various authors have suggested different models for the shape of shell. David M. Raup proposed a model where there is one magnification for the x-y plane, and another for the x-z plane. Chris Illert proposed a model where the magnification is scalar, and the same for any sense or direction with an equation like

$$\vec{F}\left( {\theta ,\varphi } \right) = e^{\alpha \varphi } \left( {\begin{array}{*{20}c}
{\cos \left( \varphi  \right),} & { - \sin (\varphi ),} & {\rm{0}}  \\
{\sin (\varphi ),} & {\cos \left( \varphi  \right),} & 0  \\
{0,} & {{\rm{0,}}} & 1  \\
\end{array}} \right)\vec{F}\left( {\theta ,0} \right)$$

which starts with an initial generating curve $\vec{F}\left( {\theta ,0} \right)$ and applies a rotation and exponential magnification.

== See also ==
- Helix
- Seashell
- Spiral
