= LL Pegasi =

Variable star in the constellation Pegasus

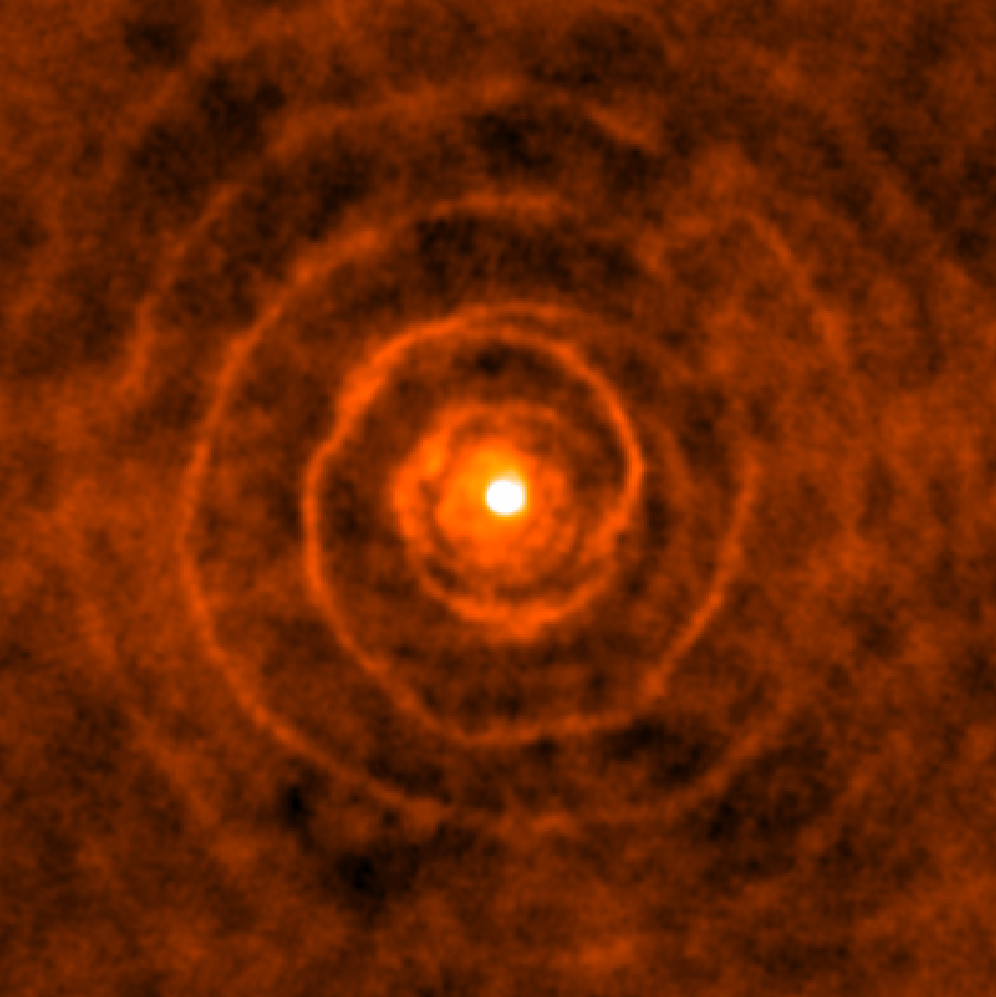
- LL Pegasi is continuously losing gaseous material as it evolves into a planetary nebula.

Observation data Epoch J2000.0 Equinox J2000.0 (ICRS)
- Constellation: Pegasus
- Right ascension: 23^{h} 19^{m} 12.607^{s}
- Declination: +17° 11′ 33.13″

Characteristics
- Evolutionary stage: Asymptotic giant branch
- Spectral type: C
- Variable type: Mira

Astrometry
Distance	1,300 pc

Details

A
Mass	3.5 M_{☉}
Radius	1,100 (Note: Applying the Stefan–Boltzmann law with a nominal solar effective temperature of 5,772 K: $$\sqrt{\biggl(\frac{5,772}{1,800}\biggr)^4 \cdot {10,900}} = 1,100\ R_\odot$$.) R_{☉}
Luminosity	10,900 L_{☉}
Temperature	1,800 K

B
Mass	3.1 M_{☉}

Other designations
- LL Pegasi, IRAS 23166+1655, 2MASS J23191260+1711331, RAFGL 3068

Database references
SIMBAD	data

LL Pegasi (AFGL 3068) is a Mira variable star surrounded by a pinwheel-shaped nebula, IRAS 23166+1655, thought to be a preplanetary nebula. It is a binary system that includes an extreme carbon star. The pair is hidden by the dust cloud ejected from the carbon star and is only visible in infrared light.

== Variability ==
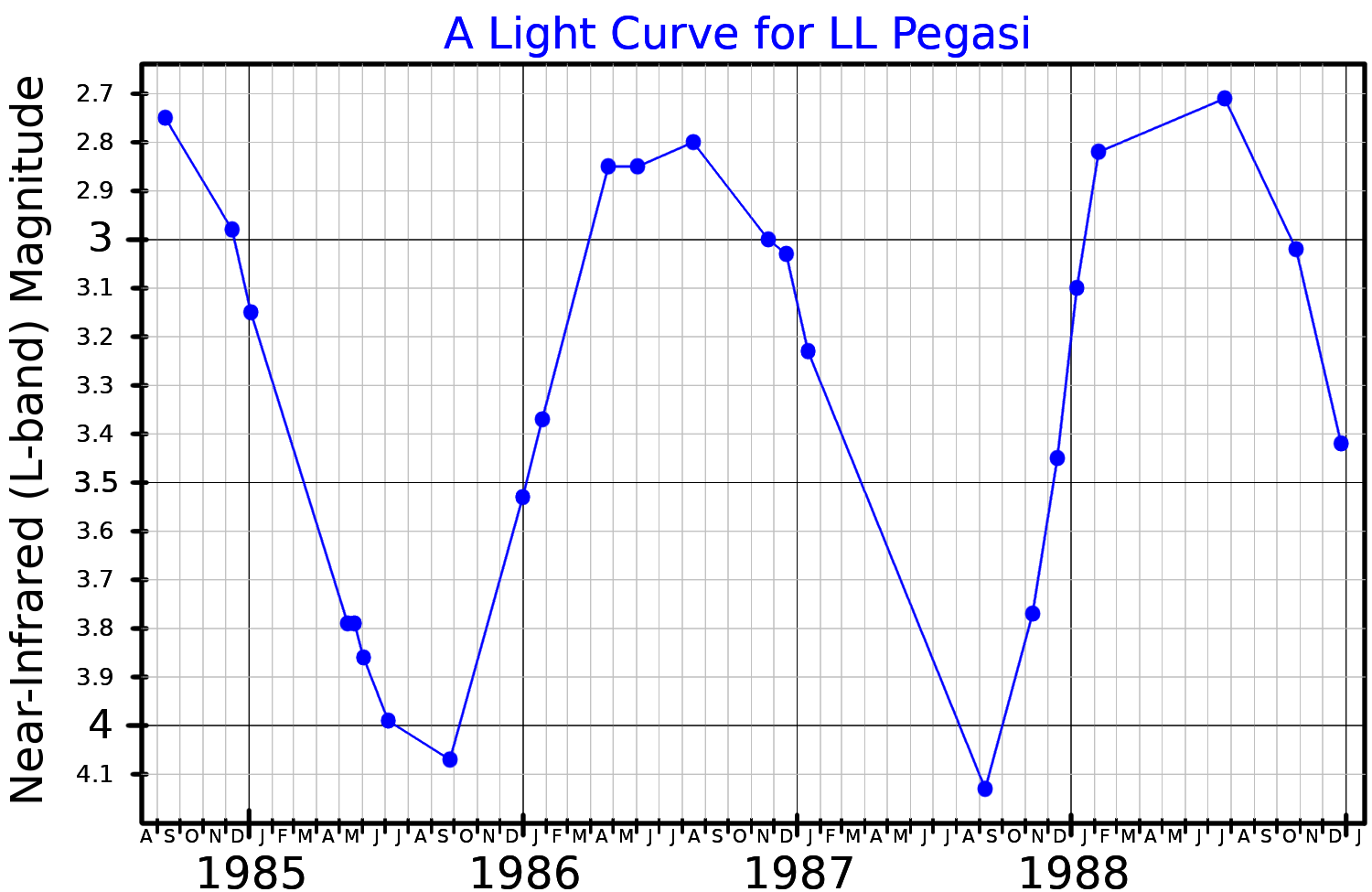
A near-infrared (L- band) light curve for LL Pegasi, plotted from data published by Le Bertre (1992)

LL Pegasi is obscured at visual wavelengths, but is strongly variable in brightness at infrared wavelengths. It is classified as a Mira variable and has a period of about 696 days.

== Nebula ==
The nebula displays an unusual Archimedean spiral shape. The shape is thought to be formed through the interaction between the stellar companion and the carbon star, as has been seen in other binary systems, although not with such a precise geometric form. The distance between the spiral arms and their rate of expansion is consistent with estimates of the pair's 810 year orbital period based on their apparent angular separation.

== Gallery ==
Observed structure surrounding the binary star system.

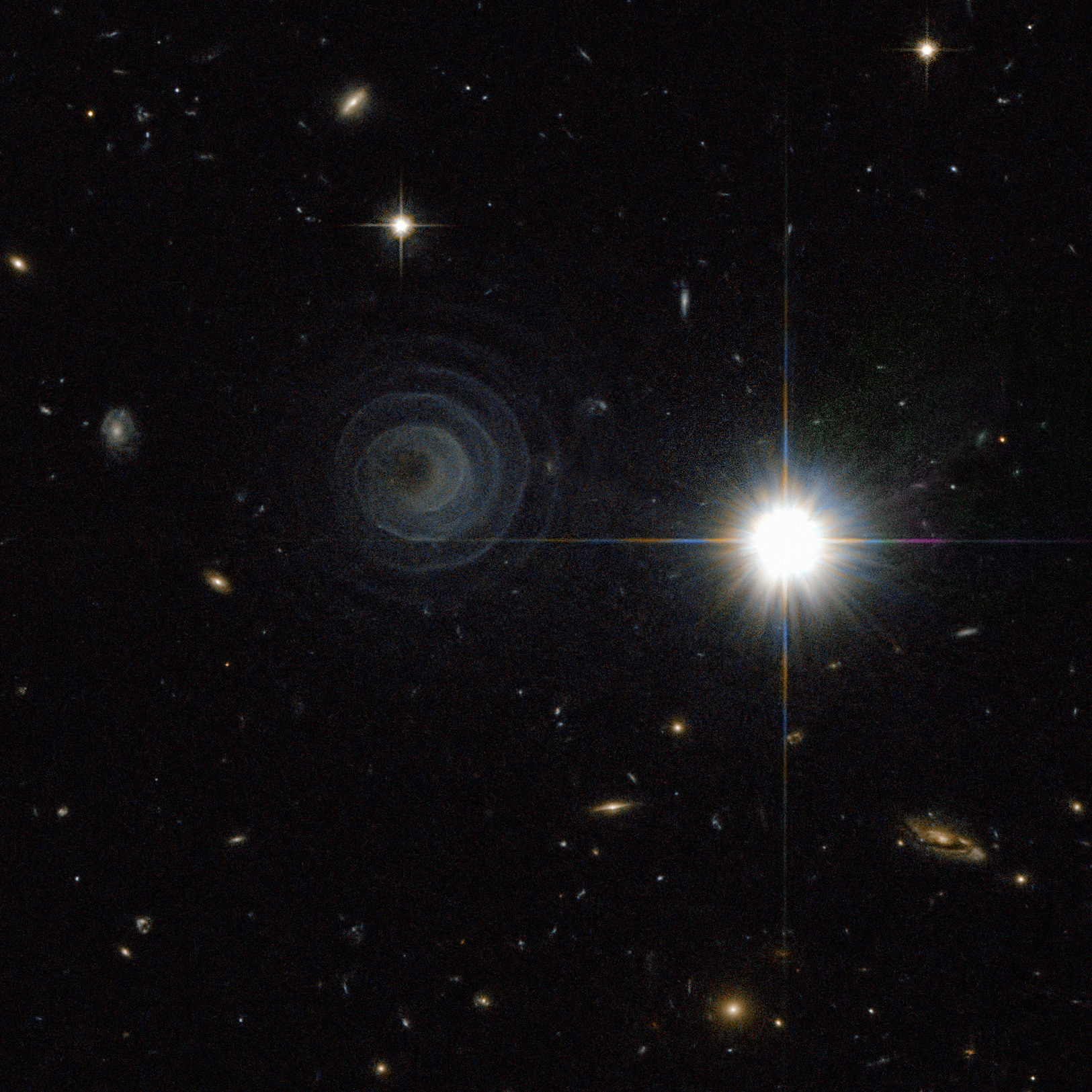
Hubble Space Telescope image of IRAS 23166+1655, taken in the near-infrared. The bright object to the right is a star much closer to Earth. It was used as a guide star for adaptive optics corrections that allowed the Keck II telescope to resolve the LL Pegasi binary pair.

== See also ==
- List of largest stars
