= Archimedean spiral =

Spiral with constant distance from itself

Three 360° loops of one arm of an Archimedean spiral

The Archimedean spiral (also known as Archimedes' spiral, the arithmetic spiral) is a spiral named after the 3rd-century BC Greek mathematician Archimedes. The term Archimedean spiral is sometimes used to refer to the more general class of spirals of this type (see below), in contrast to Archimedes' spiral (the specific arithmetic spiral of Archimedes). It is the locus corresponding to the locations over time of a point moving away from a fixed point with a constant speed along a line that rotates with constant angular velocity. Equivalently, in polar coordinates (r, θ) it can be described by the equation
$$r = b\cdot\theta$$
with real number b. Changing the parameter b controls the distance between loops.

From the above equation, it can thus be stated: position of the particle from point of start is proportional to angle θ as time elapses.

Archimedes described such a spiral in his book On Spirals. Conon of Samos was a friend of his and Pappus states that this spiral was discovered by Conon.

== Derivation of general equation of spiral ==
A physical approach is used below to understand the notion of Archimedean spirals.

Suppose a point object moves in the Cartesian system with a constant velocity v directed parallel to the x-axis, with respect to the xy-plane. Let at time t = 0, the object was at an arbitrary point (c, 0, 0). If the xy plane rotates with a constant angular velocity ω about the z-axis, then the velocity of the point with respect to z-axis may be written as:

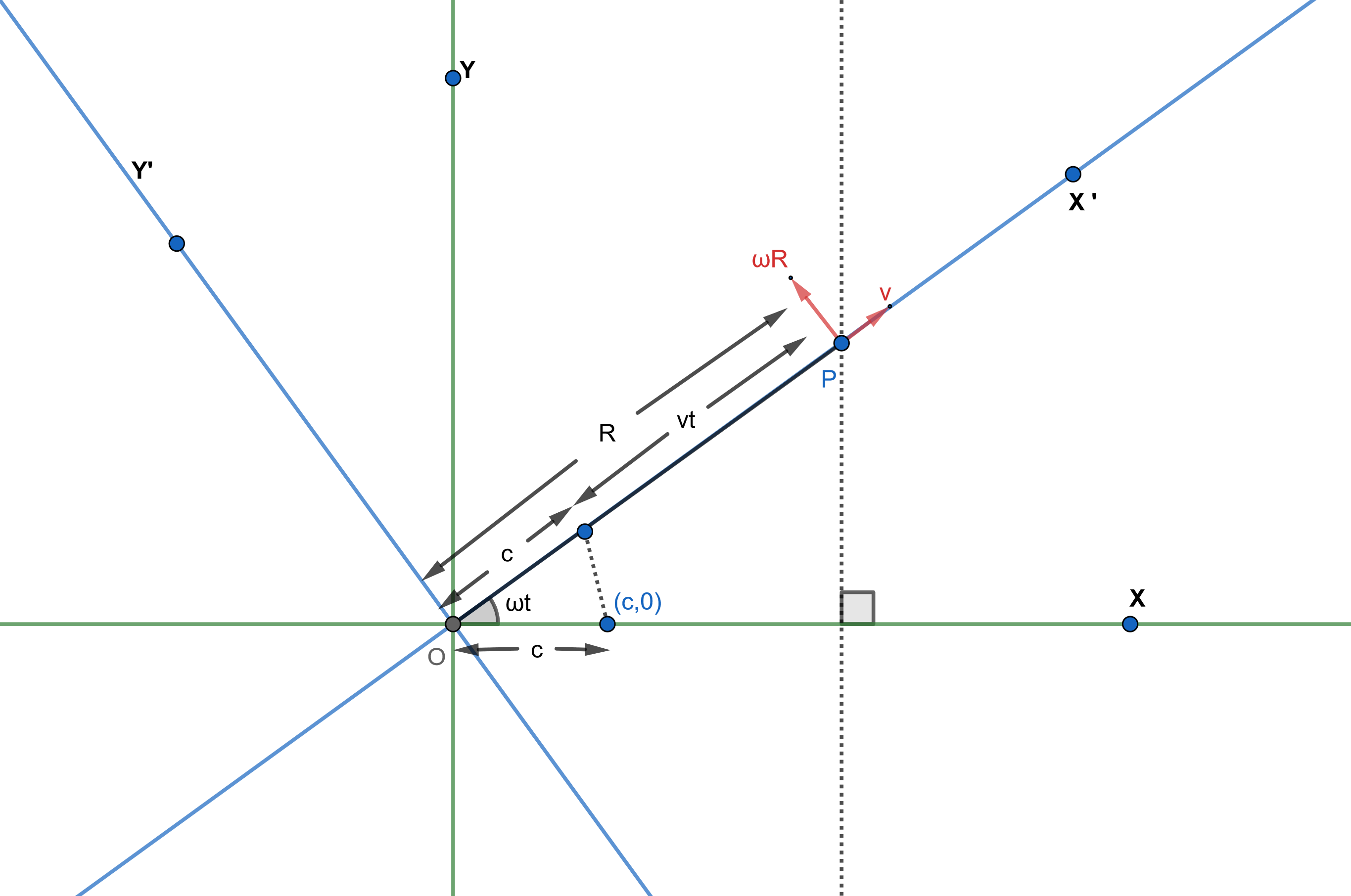
The xy plane rotates to an angle ωt (anticlockwise) about the origin in time t. (c, 0) is the position of the object at t = 0. P is the position of the object at time t, at a distance of R = vt + c.

$$\begin{align}
|v_0|&=\sqrt{v^2+\omega^2(vt+c)^2} \\
v_x&=v \cos \omega t - \omega (vt+c) \sin \omega t \\
v_y&=v \sin \omega t + \omega (vt+c) \cos \omega t
\end{align}$$

As shown in the figure alongside, we have vt + c representing the modulus of the position vector of the particle at any time t, with v_{x} and v_{y} as the velocity components along the x and y axes, respectively.

$$\begin{align}
\int v_x \,dt &=x \\
\int v_y \,dt &=y
\end{align}$$

The above equations can be integrated by applying integration by parts, leading to the following parametric equations:

$$\begin{align}
x&=(vt + c) \cos \omega t \\
y&=(vt+c) \sin \omega t
\end{align}$$

Squaring the two equations and then adding (and some small alterations) results in the Cartesian equation
$$\sqrt{x^2+y^2}=\frac{v}{\omega}\cdot \arctan \frac{y}{x} +c$$
(using the fact that ωt = θ and θ = arctan y/x) or
$$\tan \left(\left(\sqrt{x^2+y^2}-c\right)\cdot\frac{\omega}{v}\right) = \frac{y}{x}$$

Its polar form is
$$r= \frac{v}{\omega}\cdot \theta +c.$$

== Arc length and curvature ==
Osculating circles of the Archimedean spiral, tangent to the spiral and having the same curvature at the tangent point. The spiral itself is not drawn, but can be seen as the points where the circles are especially close to each other.

Given the parametrization in cartesian coordinates
$$f\colon\theta\mapsto (r\,\cos \theta, r\,\sin \theta) = (b\, \theta\,\cos \theta,b\, \theta\,\sin\theta)$$
the arc length from θ_{1} to θ_{2} is
$$\frac{b}{2}\left[\theta\,\sqrt{1+\theta^2}+\ln\left(\theta+\sqrt{1+\theta^2}\right)\right]_{\theta_1}^{\theta_2}$$
or, equivalently:
$$\frac{b}{2}\left[\theta\,\sqrt{1+\theta^2}+\operatorname{arsinh}\theta\right]_{\theta_1}^{\theta_2}.$$
The total length from θ_{1} = 0 to θ_{2} = θ is therefore
$$\frac{b}{2}\left[\theta\,\sqrt{1+\theta^2}+\ln \left(\theta+\sqrt{1+\theta^2} \right)\right].$$

The curvature is given by
$$\kappa=\frac{\theta^2+2}{b\left(\theta^2+1\right)^\frac{3}{2}}$$

== Characteristics ==
Archimedean spiral represented on a polar graph

The Archimedean spiral has the property that any ray from the origin intersects successive turnings of the spiral in points with a constant separation distance (equal to 2πb if θ is measured in radians), hence the name "arithmetic spiral". In contrast to this, in a logarithmic spiral these distances, as well as the distances of the intersection points measured from the origin, form a geometric progression.

The Archimedean spiral has two arms, one for θ > 0 and one for θ < 0. The two arms are smoothly connected at the origin. Only one arm is shown on the accompanying graph. Taking the mirror image of this arm across the y-axis will yield the other arm.

For large θ a point moves with well-approximated uniform acceleration along the Archimedean spiral while the spiral corresponds to the locations over time of a point moving away from a fixed point with a constant speed along a line which rotates with constant angular velocity (see contribution from Mikhail Gaichenkov).

As the Archimedean spiral grows, its evolute asymptotically approaches a circle with radius |v|/ω.

== General Archimedean spiral ==
Sometimes the term Archimedean spiral is used for the more general group of spirals
$$r = a + b\cdot\theta^\frac{1}{c}.$$

The normal Archimedean spiral occurs when c = 1. Other spirals falling into this group include the hyperbolic spiral (c = −1), Fermat's spiral (c = 2), and the lituus (c = −2).

== Applications ==
One method of squaring the circle, due to Archimedes, makes use of an Archimedean spiral. Archimedes also showed how the spiral can be used to trisect an angle. Both approaches relax the traditional limitations on the use of straightedge and compass in ancient Greek geometric proofs.

Mechanism of a scroll compressor

The Archimedean spiral has a variety of real-world applications. Scroll compressors, used for compressing gases, have rotors that can be made from two interleaved Archimedean spirals, involutes of a circle of the same size that almost resemble Archimedean spirals, or hybrid curves.

Archimedean spirals can be found in spiral antenna, which can be operated over a wide range of frequencies.

The coils of watch balance springs and the grooves of very early gramophone records form Archimedean spirals, making the grooves evenly spaced (although variable track spacing was later introduced to maximize the amount of music that could be cut onto a record).

Asking for a patient to draw an Archimedean spiral is a way of quantifying human tremor; this information helps in diagnosing neurological diseases.

Archimedean spirals are also used in digital light processing (DLP) projection systems to minimize the "rainbow effect", making it look as if multiple colors are displayed at the same time, when in reality red, green, and blue are being cycled extremely quickly. Additionally, Archimedean spirals are used in food microbiology to quantify bacterial concentration through a spiral platter.

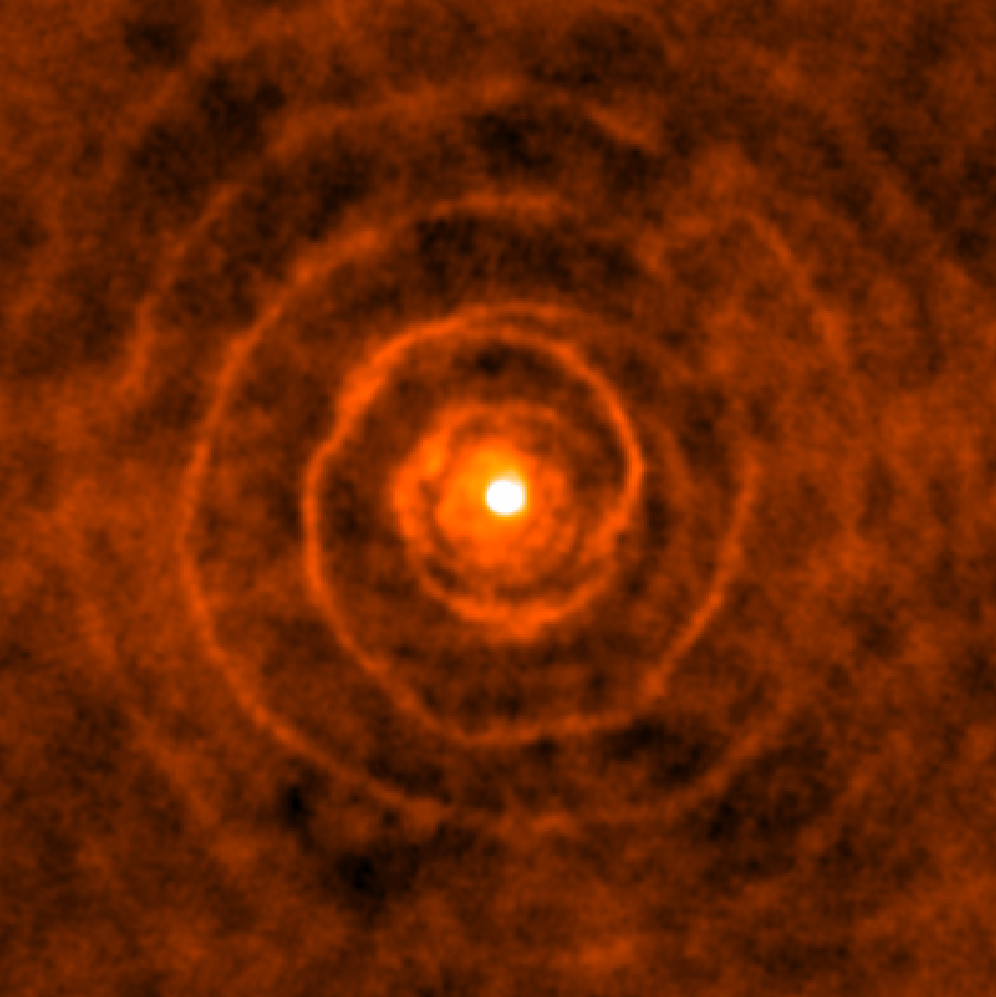
Atacama Large Millimeter Array image of LL Pegasi

They are also used to model the pattern that occurs in a roll of paper or tape of constant thickness wrapped around a cylinder.

Many dynamic spirals (such as the Parker spiral of the solar wind, or the pattern made by a Catherine's wheel) are Archimedean. For instance, the star LL Pegasi shows an approximate Archimedean spiral in the dust clouds surrounding it, thought to be ejected matter from the star that has been shepherded into a spiral by another companion star as part of a double star system.

== Construction methods ==
The Archimedean Spiral cannot be constructed precisely by traditional compass and straightedge methods, since the arithmetic spiral requires the radius of the curve to be incremented constantly as the angle at the origin is incremented. But an arithmetic spiral can be constructed approximately, to varying degrees of precision, by various manual drawing methods. One such method uses compass and straightedge; another method uses a modified string compass.

The common traditional construction uses compass and straightedge to approximate the arithmetic spiral. First, a large circle is constructed and its circumference is subdivided by 12 diameters into 12 arcs (of 30 degrees each; see regular dodecagon). Next, the radius of this circle is itself subdivided into 12 unit segments (radial units), and a series of concentric circles is constructed, each with radius incremented by one radial unit. Starting with the horizontal diameter and the innermost concentric circle, the point is marked where its radius intersects its circumference; one then moves to the next concentric circle and to the next diameter (moving up to construct a counterclockwise spiral, or down for clockwise) to mark the next point. After all points have been marked, successive points are connected by a line approximating the arithmetic spiral (or by a smooth curve of some sort; see French Curve). Depending on the desired degree of precision, this method can be improved by increasing the size of the large outer circle, making more subdivisions of both its circumference and radius, increasing the number of concentric circles (see Polygonal Spiral). Approximating the Archimedean Spiral by this method is of course reminiscent of Archimedes’ famous method of approximating π by doubling the sides of successive polygons (see Polygon approximation of π).

Compass and straightedge construction of the Spiral of Theodorus is another simple method to approximate the Archimedean Spiral.

A mechanical method for constructing the arithmetic spiral uses a modified string compass, where the string wraps and winds (or unwraps/unwinds) about a fixed central pin (that does not pivot), thereby incrementing (or decrementing) the length of the radius (string) as the angle changes (the string winds around the fixed pin which does not pivot). Such a method is a simple way to create an arithmetic spiral, arising naturally from use of a string compass with winding pin (not the loose pivot of a common string compass). The string compass drawing tool has various modifications and designs, and this construction method is reminiscent of string-based methods for creating ellipses (with two fixed pins).

Yet another mechanical method is a variant of the previous string compass method, providing greater precision and more flexibility. Instead of the central pin and string of the string compass, this device uses a non-rotating shaft (column) with helical threads (screw; see Archimedes’ screw) to which are attached two slotted arms: one horizontal arm is affixed to (travels up) the screw threads of the vertical shaft at one end, and holds a drawing tool at the other end; another sloped arm is affixed at one end to the top of the screw shaft, and is joined by a pin loosely fitted in its slot to the slot of the horizontal arm. The two arms rotate together and work in consort to produce the arithmetic spiral: as the horizontal arm gradually climbs the screw, that arm’s slotted attachment to the sloped arm gradually shortens the drawing radius. The angle of the sloped arm remains constant throughout (traces a cone), and setting a different angle varies the pitch of the spiral. This device provides a high degree of precision, depending on the precision with which the device is machined (machining a precise helical screw thread is a related challenge). And of course the use of a screw shaft in this mechanism is reminiscent of Archimedes’ screw.

== See also ==
- Golden spiral – Self-similar curve related to golden ratio
- List of spirals
- Triple spiral symbol – Symbol with three-fold rotational symmetry
