= Spirangle =

Spiral polygonal chain

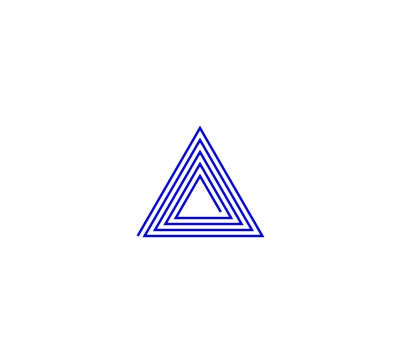
3-angle spirangle or triangle spiral

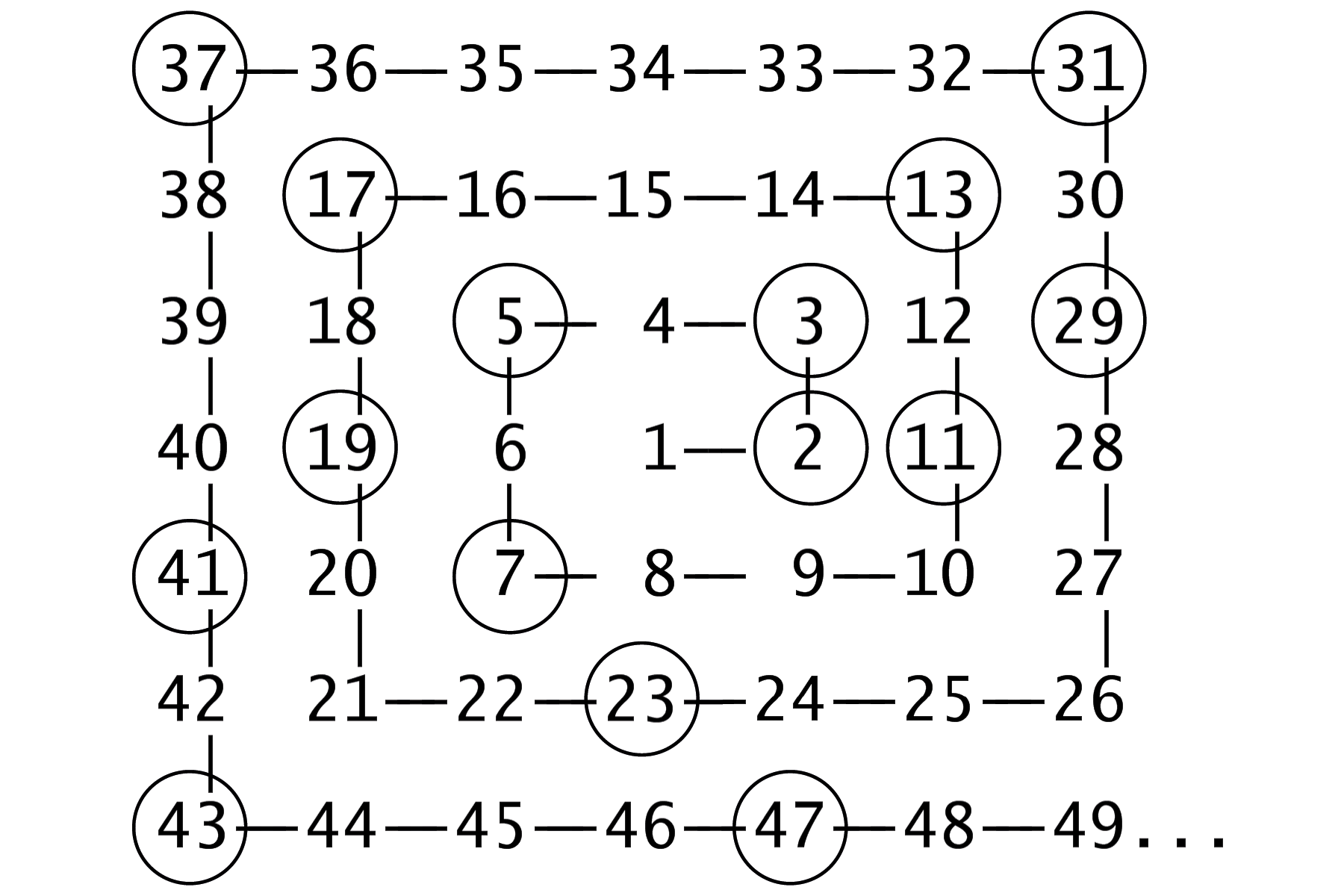
Ulam spiral in a 4-angle spirangle or rectangle spiral

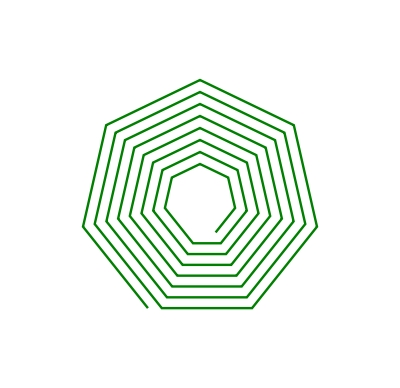
7-angle spirangle or heptagon spiral

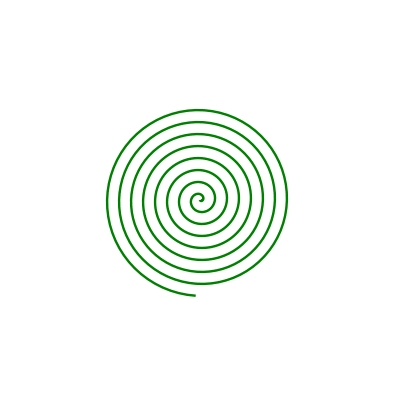
70-angle spirangle

In geometry, a spirangle is a spiral polygonal chain. Spirangles are similar to spirals in that they expand from a center point as they grow larger, but they are made out of straight line segments, instead of curves. Spirangle vectographs are used in vision therapy to promote stereopsis and help resolve problems with hand–eye coordination.

== Two-dimensional spirangles ==
A two-dimensional spirangle is an open figure consisting of a line bent into angles similar to a corresponding polygon. The spirangle can start at a center point, or a distance from the center, and has some number of turns around the center point.

== Three-dimensional spirangles ==
Three-dimensional spirangles have layers that slant upward, progressively gaining height from the previous segment. This is similar to staircases in large buildings that turn at the top of each flight. The segments also may progressively lose an amount of length and resemble a pyramid.

== Uses ==
- Ophthalmology — vectograms
- Electronics — printed inductors
- Architecture — 'spiral' staircases
- Jewelry — earrings, pendants
- Search algorithms — optimal scanning of a region of interest, for example a crime scene or a region of the celestial sphere

== See also ==
- Turtle graphics
