= Logarithmic spiral =

Self-similar growth curve

Logarithmic spiral (pitch 10°)

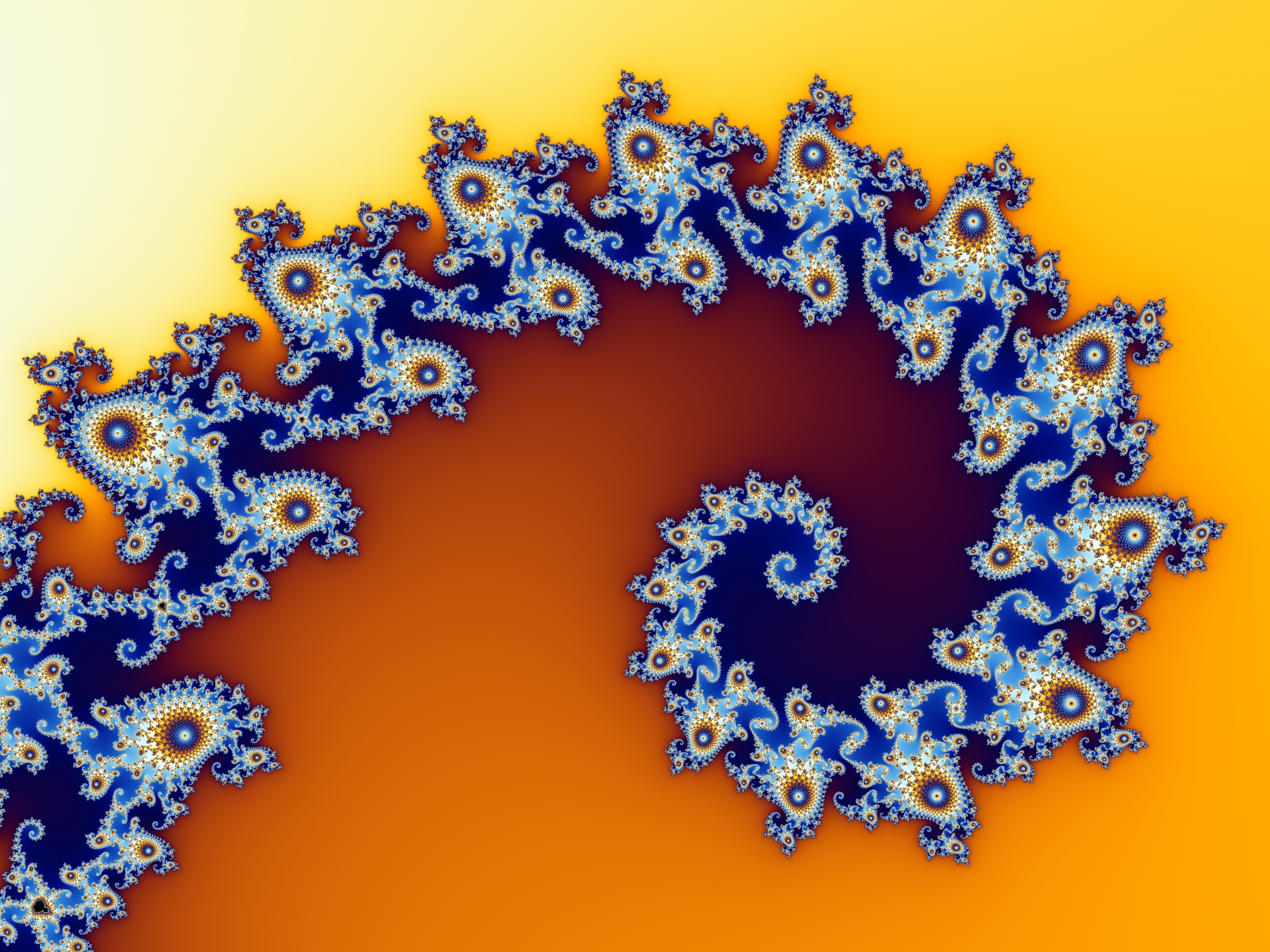
A section of the Mandelbrot set following a logarithmic spiral

A logarithmic spiral, equiangular spiral, or growth spiral is a self-similar spiral curve that often appears in nature. The first to describe a logarithmic spiral was Albrecht Dürer (1525) who called it an "eternal line" ("ewige Linie"). More than a century later, the curve was discussed by Descartes (1638), and later extensively investigated by Jacob Bernoulli, who called it Spira mirabilis, "the marvelous spiral".

The logarithmic spiral is distinct from the Archimedean spiral in that the distances between the turnings of a logarithmic spiral increase in a geometric progression, whereas for an Archimedean spiral these distances are constant.

== Definition ==
In polar coordinates $(r, \varphi)$ the logarithmic spiral can be written as
$$r = ae^{k\varphi},\quad \varphi  \in \R,$$
or
$$\varphi = \frac{1}{k} \ln \frac{r}{a},$$
with $e$ being the base of natural logarithms, and $a > 0$, $k\ne 0$ being real constants.

== In Cartesian coordinates ==
The logarithmic spiral with the polar equation
$$r = a e^{k\varphi}$$
can be represented in Cartesian coordinates $(x=r\cos\varphi,\, y=r\sin\varphi)$ by
$$x = a e^{k\varphi}\cos \varphi, \qquad y = a e^{k\varphi}\sin \varphi.$$
In the complex plane $(z=x+iy,\, e^{i\varphi}=\cos\varphi + i\sin\varphi)$:
$$z=ae^{(k+i)\varphi}.$$

== Spira mirabilis and Jacob Bernoulli ==
Spira mirabilis, Latin for "miraculous spiral", is another name for the logarithmic spiral. Although this curve had already been named by other mathematicians, the specific name ("miraculous" or "marvelous" spiral) was given to this curve by Jacob Bernoulli, because he was fascinated by one of its unique mathematical properties: the size of the spiral increases but its shape is unaltered with each successive curve, a property known as self-similarity. Possibly as a result of this unique property, the spira mirabilis has evolved in nature, appearing in certain growing forms such as nautilus shells and sunflower heads. Jacob Bernoulli wanted such a spiral engraved on his headstone along with the phrase "Eadem mutata resurgo" ("Although changed, I shall arise the same."), but, by error, an Archimedean spiral was placed there instead.

== Properties ==
Definition of slope angle and sector

Animation showing the constant angle between an intersecting circle centred at the origin and a logarithmic spiral.

The logarithmic spiral $r=a e^{k\varphi} \;,\; k\ne 0,$ has the following properties (see Spiral):

- Pitch angle: Constant value $\tan\alpha=k\quad$
  with pitch angle $\alpha$ (see diagram and animation).
  (In case of $k=0$ angle $\alpha$ would be 0 and the curve a circle with radius $a$.)
- Curvature: $\kappa=\frac{1}{r\sqrt{1+k^2}}=\frac{\cos \alpha}{r}$
- Arc length: $L(\varphi_1,\varphi_2)=\frac{\sqrt{k^2+1}}{k}\big(r(\varphi_2)-r(\varphi_1)\big)= \frac{r(\varphi_2)-r(\varphi_1)}{\sin \alpha}$
  Especially: $\ L(-\infty,\varphi_2)=\frac{r(\varphi_2)}{\sin \alpha}\quad\;$ is finite if $k > 0$.
  This property was first realized by Evangelista Torricelli even before calculus had been invented.
- Sector area: $A=\frac{r(\varphi_2)^2-r(\varphi_1)^2}{4k}$
- Inversion: Circle inversion ($r\to 1/r$) maps the logarithmic spiral $r=a e^{k\varphi}$ onto the logarithmic spiral $r=\tfrac{1}{a} e^{-k\varphi} \, .$

Examples for $a= 1,2,3,4,5$

- Rotating, scaling: Rotating the spiral by angle $\varphi_0$ yields the spiral $r=ae^{-k\varphi_0}e^{k\varphi}$, which is the original spiral uniformly scaled (at the origin) by $e^{-k\varphi_0}$.
  Scaling by $\;e^{kn2\pi}\; , n=\pm 1,\pm2,...,\;$ gives the same curve.
- Self-similarity: A result of the previous property:
  A scaled logarithmic spiral is congruent (by rotation) to the original curve.
  Example: The diagram shows spirals with slope angle $\alpha=20^\circ$ and $a=1,2,3,4,5$. Hence they are all scaled copies of the red one. But they can also be generated by rotating the red one by angles $-109^\circ,-173^\circ,-218^\circ,-253^\circ$ resp.. All spirals have no points in common (see property on complex exponential function).
- Relation to other curves: Logarithmic spirals are congruent to their own involutes, evolutes, and the pedal curves based on their centers.
- Complex exponential function: The exponential function exactly maps all lines not parallel with the real or imaginary axis in the complex plane, to all logarithmic spirals in the complex plane with centre at $0$:
  $$z(t)=\underbrace{(kt+b)\; +it}_{\text{line}}\quad  \to\quad  e^{z(t)}=e^{kt+b}\cdot e^{it}= \underbrace{e^b e^{kt}(\cos t+i\sin t)}_{\text{log. spiral}}$$
  The pitch angle $\alpha$ of the logarithmic spiral is the angle between the line and the imaginary axis.

== Special cases and approximations ==
The golden spiral is a logarithmic spiral that grows outward by a factor of the golden ratio for every 90 degrees of rotation (pitch angle about 17.03239 degrees). It can be approximated by a "Fibonacci spiral", made of a sequence of quarter circles with radii proportional to Fibonacci numbers.

== In nature ==
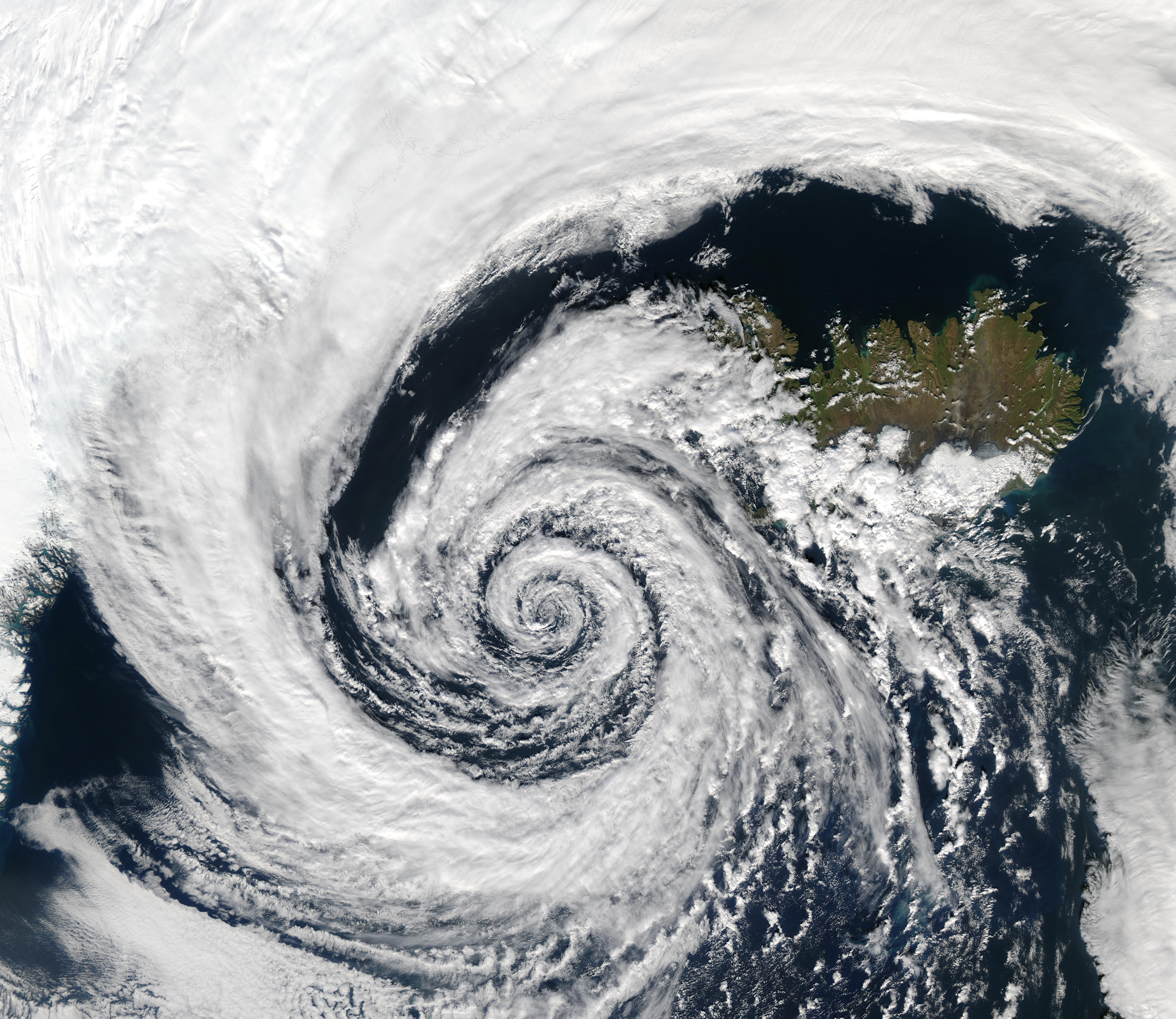
An extratropical cyclone over Iceland shows an approximately logarithmic spiral pattern

The arms of spiral galaxies often have the shape of a logarithmic spiral, here the Whirlpool Galaxy

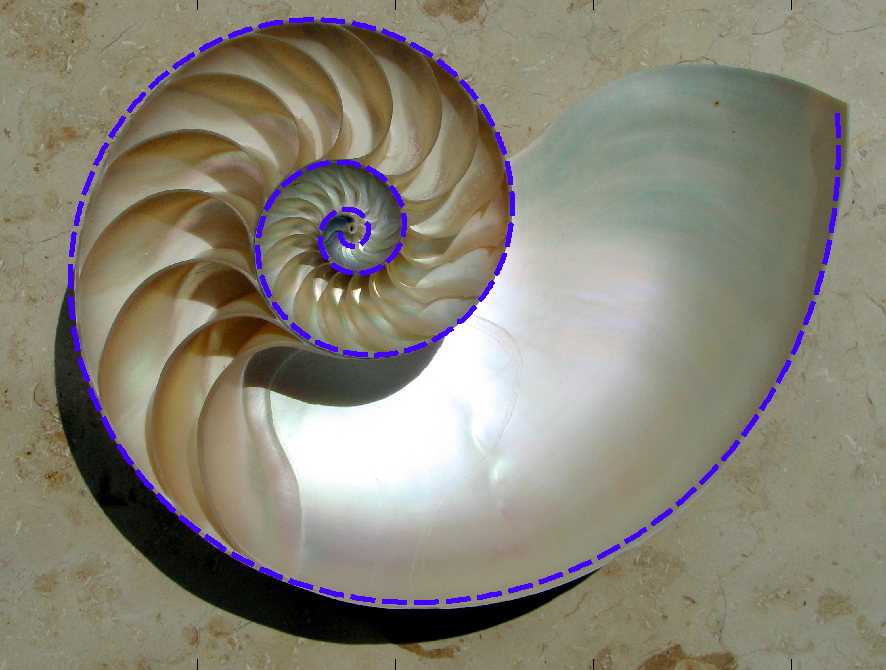
Cutaway of a nautilus shell showing the chambers arranged in an approximately logarithmic spiral. The plotted spiral (dashed blue curve) is based on growth rate parameter $b = 0.1759$, resulting in a pitch of $\arctan b \approx 10^\circ$.

In several natural phenomena one may find curves that are close to being logarithmic spirals. Here follow some examples and reasons:

- The approach of a hawk to its prey in classical pursuit, assuming the prey travels in a straight line. Their sharpest view is at an angle to their direction of flight; this angle is the same as the spiral's pitch.
- The approach of an insect to a light source. They are used to having the light source at a constant angle to their flight path. Usually the Sun (or Moon for nocturnal species) is the only light source and flying that way will result in a practically straight line. In the same token, a rhumb line approximates a logarithmic spiral close to a pole.
- The arms of spiral galaxies. The Milky Way galaxy has several spiral arms, each of which is roughly a logarithmic spiral with pitch of about 12 degrees. However, although spiral galaxies have often been modeled as logarithmic spirals, Archimedean spirals, or hyperbolic spirals, their pitch angles vary with distance from the galactic center, unlike logarithmic spirals (for which this angle does not vary), and also at variance with the other mathematical spirals used to model them.
- The nerves of the cornea (this is, corneal nerves of the subepithelial layer terminate near superficial epithelial layer of the cornea in a logarithmic spiral pattern).
- The bands of tropical cyclones, such as hurricanes.
- Many biological structures including the shells of mollusks. In these cases, the reason may be construction from expanding similar shapes, as is the case for polygonal figures.
- Logarithmic spiral beaches can form as the result of wave refraction and diffraction by the coast. Half Moon Bay (California) is an example of such a type of beach.

== In engineering applications ==
A kerf-canceling mechanism leverages the self similarity of the logarithmic spiral to lock in place under rotation, independent of the kerf of the cut.

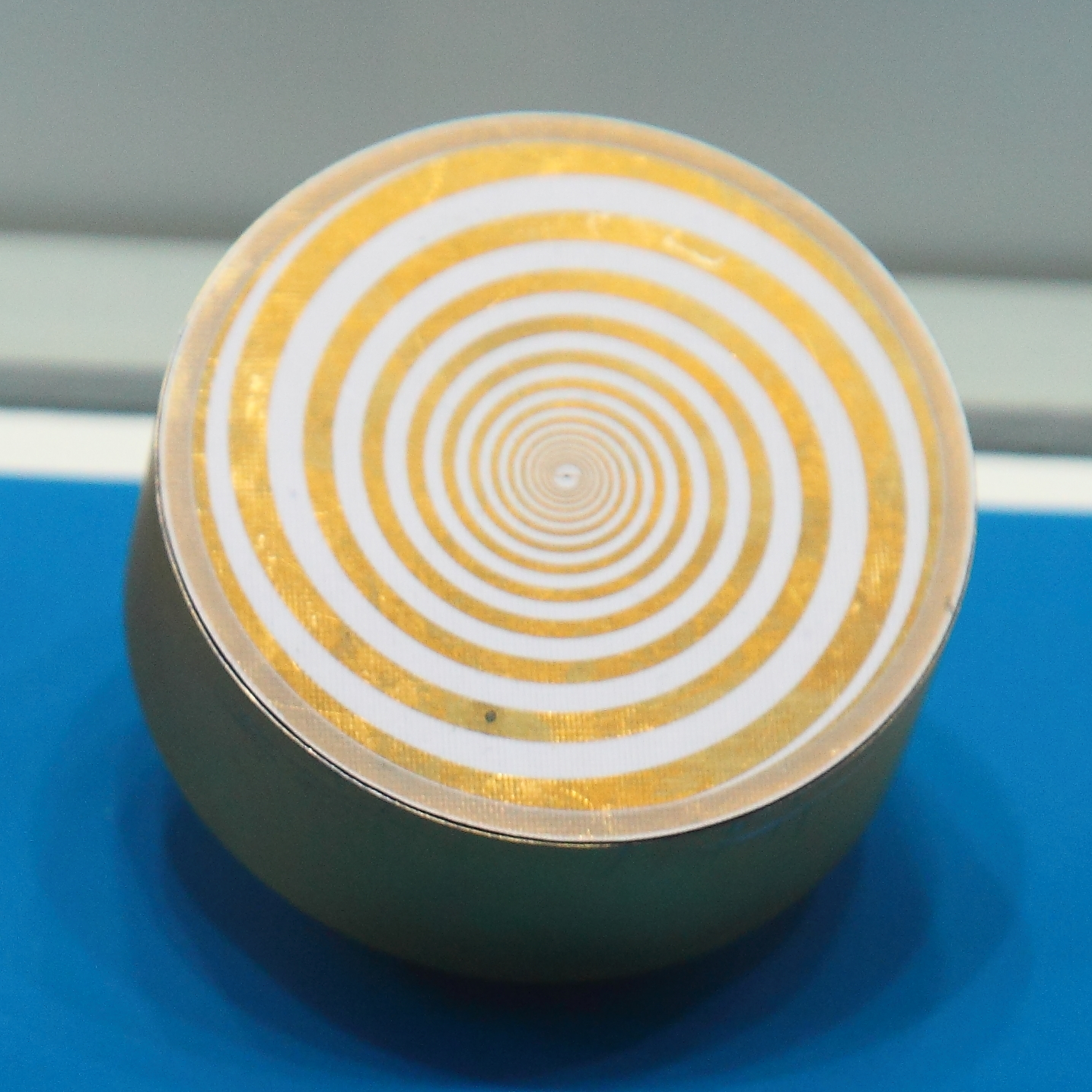
A logarithmic spiral antenna

- Logarithmic spiral antennas are frequency-independent antennas, that is, antennas whose radiation pattern, impedance and polarization remain largely unmodified over a wide bandwidth.
- When manufacturing mechanisms by subtractive fabrication machines (such as laser cutters), there can be a loss of precision when the mechanism is fabricated on a different machine due to the difference of material removed (that is, the kerf) by each machine in the cutting process. To adjust for this variation of kerf, the self-similar property of the logarithmic spiral has been used to design a kerf cancelling mechanism for laser cutters.
- Logarithmic spiral bevel gears are a type of spiral bevel gear whose gear tooth centerline is a logarithmic spiral. A logarithmic spiral has the advantage of providing equal angles between the tooth centerline and the radial lines, which gives the meshing transmission more stability.
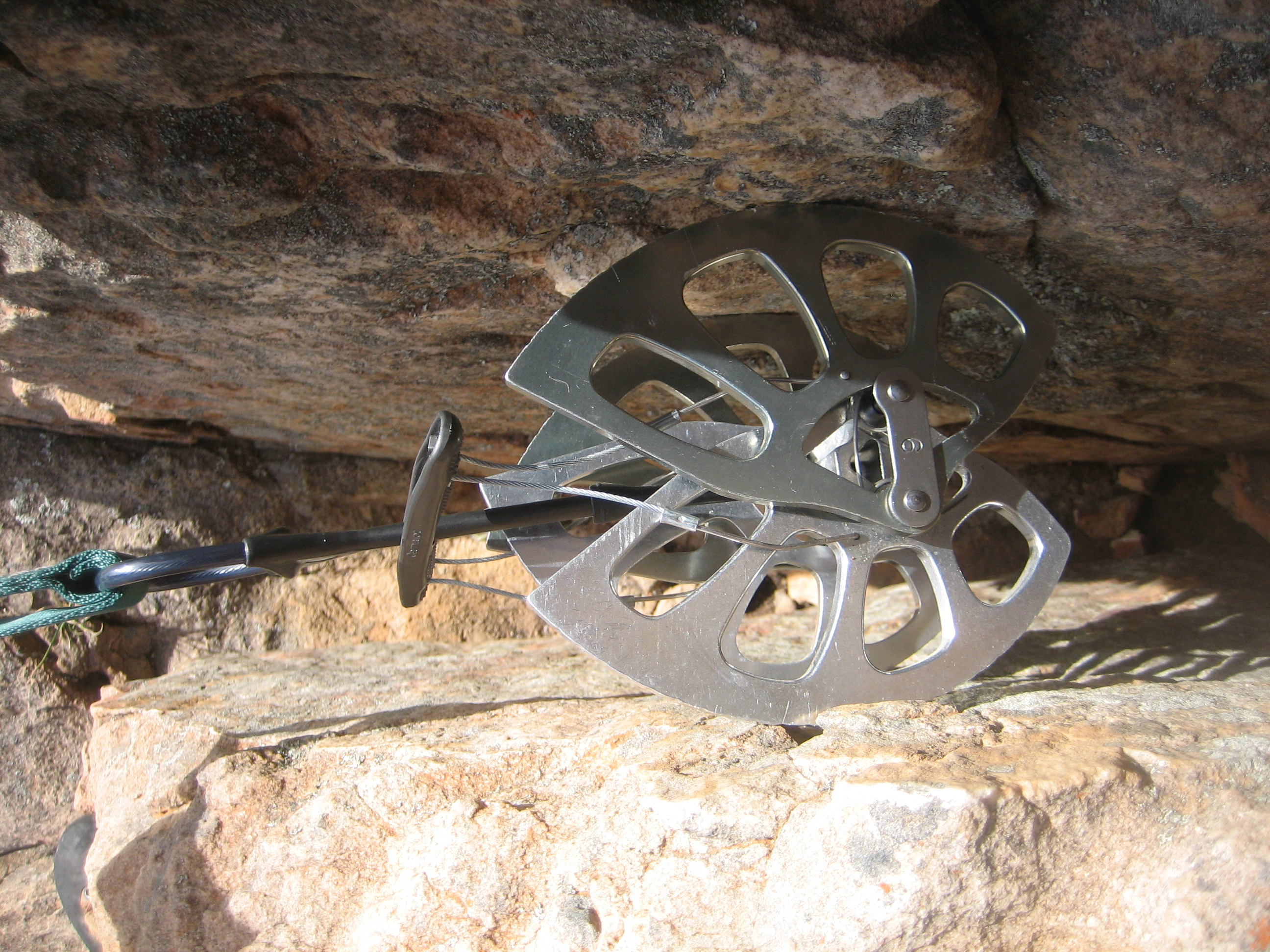
A spring-loaded camming device, with logarithmic spiral cam surfaces
- In rock climbing, spring-loaded camming devices are made from metal cams whose outer gripping surfaces are shaped as arcs of logarithmic spirals. When the device is inserted into a rock crack, the rotation of these cams expands their combined width to match the width of the crack, while maintaining a constant angle against the surface of the rock (relative to the center of the spiral, where force is applied). The pitch angle of the spiral is chosen to optimize the friction of the device against the rock.
- Soft robots based on the logarithmic spiral were designed for scalable and efficient 3D printing. Using cable-driven actuation, they mimic octopus-like movements for stable and versatile object manipulation.

== See also ==
- Archimedean spiral
- Epispiral
- List of spirals
- Mice problem, a geometric problem asking for the path followed by mice chasing one another whose solution is a logarithmic spiral
- Tait–Kneser theorem
