= Lituus (mathematics) =

Spiral

Branch for positive r

The lituus spiral (/ˈlɪtju.əs/) is a spiral in which the polar angle θ is inversely proportional to the square of the radius r.

This spiral, which has two branches depending on the sign of r, is asymptotic to the x axis. Its points of inflexion are at

$$(\theta, r) = \left(\tfrac12, \pm\sqrt{2k}\right).$$

The curve was named for the ancient Roman lituus by Roger Cotes in a collection of papers entitled Harmonia Mensurarum (1722), which was published six years after his death.

== Coordinate representations ==
=== Polar coordinates ===
The representations of the lituus spiral in polar coordinates (r, θ) is given by the equation

$$r = \frac{a}{\sqrt{\theta}},$$

where θ ≥ 0 and a ≠ 0.

=== Cartesian coordinates ===
The lituus spiral with the polar coordinates r = a/√θ can be converted to Cartesian coordinates like any other spiral with the relationships x = r cos θ and y = r sin θ. With this conversion we get the parametric representations of the curve:

$$\begin{align}
x &= \frac{a}{\sqrt{\theta}} \cos\theta, \\
y &= \frac{a}{\sqrt{\theta}} \sin\theta. \\
\end{align}$$

These equations can in turn be rearranged to an equation in x and y:

$$\frac{y}{x} = \tan\left( \frac{a^2}{x^2 + y^2} \right).$$

Derivation of the equation in Cartesian coordinates
1. Divide $y$ by $x$:$\frac{y}{x} = \frac{\frac{a}{\sqrt{\theta}} \sin\theta}{\frac{a}{\sqrt{\theta}} \cos\theta} \Rightarrow \frac{y}{x} = \tan\theta.$
2. Solve the equation of the lituus spiral in polar coordinates: $r = \frac{a}{\sqrt{\theta}} \Leftrightarrow \theta = \frac{a^2}{r^2}.$
3. Substitute $\theta = \frac{a^2}{r^2}$: $\frac{y}{x} = \tan\left( \frac{a^2}{r^2} \right).$
4. Substitute $r = \sqrt{x^2 + y^2}$: $\frac{y}{x} = \tan\left( \frac{a^2}{\left( \sqrt{x^2 + y^2} \right)^2} \right) \Rightarrow \frac{y}{x} = \tan\left( \frac{a^2}{x^2 + y^2} \right).$

== Geometrical properties ==
=== Curvature ===
The curvature of the lituus spiral can be determined using the formula

$$\kappa = \left( 8 \theta^2 - 2 \right) \left( \frac{\theta}{1 + 4 \theta^2} \right)^\frac32.$$

=== Arc length ===
In general, the arc length of the lituus spiral cannot be expressed as a closed-form expression, but the arc length of the lituus spiral can be represented as a formula using the Gaussian hypergeometric function:

$$L = 2 \sqrt{\theta} \cdot \operatorname{_2 F_1}\left( -\frac{1}{2}, -\frac{1}{4}; \frac{3}{4}; -\frac{1}{4 \theta^2} \right) - 2 \sqrt{\theta_0} \cdot \operatorname{_2 F_1}\left( -\frac{1}{2}, -\frac{1}{4}; \frac{3}{4}; -\frac{1}{4 \theta_0^2} \right),$$

where the arc length is measured from θ = θ_{0}.

=== Tangential angle ===
The tangential angle (see Pitch angle of a spiral) of the lituus spiral can be determined using the formula

$$\phi = \theta - \arctan 2\theta.$$
