= Gastropod shell =

Part of the body of a gastropod or snail

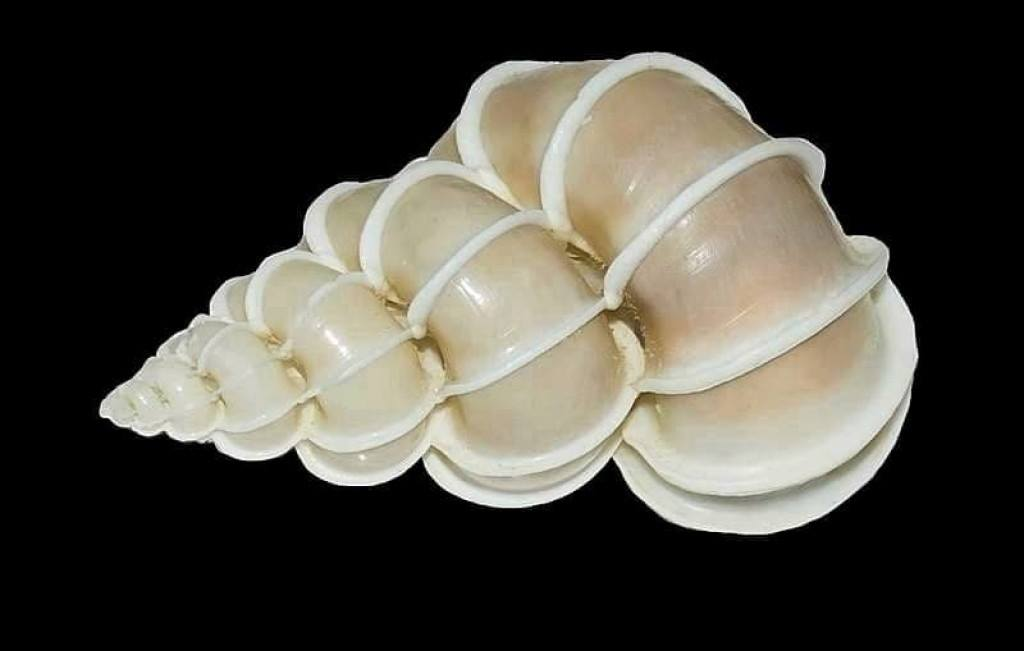
The shell of Epitonium scalare.

The gastropod shell is part of the body of many gastropods, including snails, a kind of mollusc. The shell is an exoskeleton, which protects from predators, mechanical damage, and dehydration, but also serves for muscle attachment and calcium storage. Some gastropods appear shell-less (slugs) but may have a remnant within the mantle, or in some cases the shell is reduced such that the body cannot be retracted within it (semi-slug).

Some snails also possess an operculum that seals the opening of the shell, known as the aperture, which provides further protection. The study of mollusc shells is known as conchology. The biological study of gastropods, and other molluscs in general, is malacology. Shell morphology terms vary by species group.

== Shell layers ==
The gastropod shell has three major layers secreted by the mantle. The calcareous central layer, ostracum, is typically made of calcium carbonate (CaCO_{3}) precipitated into an organic matrix known as conchiolin. The outermost layer is the periostracum which is resistant to abrasion and provides most shell coloration. The body of the snail contacts the innermost smooth layer that may be composed of mother-of-pearl or shell nacre, a dense horizontally packed form of conchiolin, which is layered upon the periostracum as the snail grows.

== Morphology ==

Morphology of typical spirally coiled shell. The shell of Zonitoides nitidus, a land snail, has dextral coiling.

Upper image: Dorsal view, showing whorls and apex
Central image: Lateral view showing the profile of the shell
Lower image: Basal view showing umbilicus in the centre.

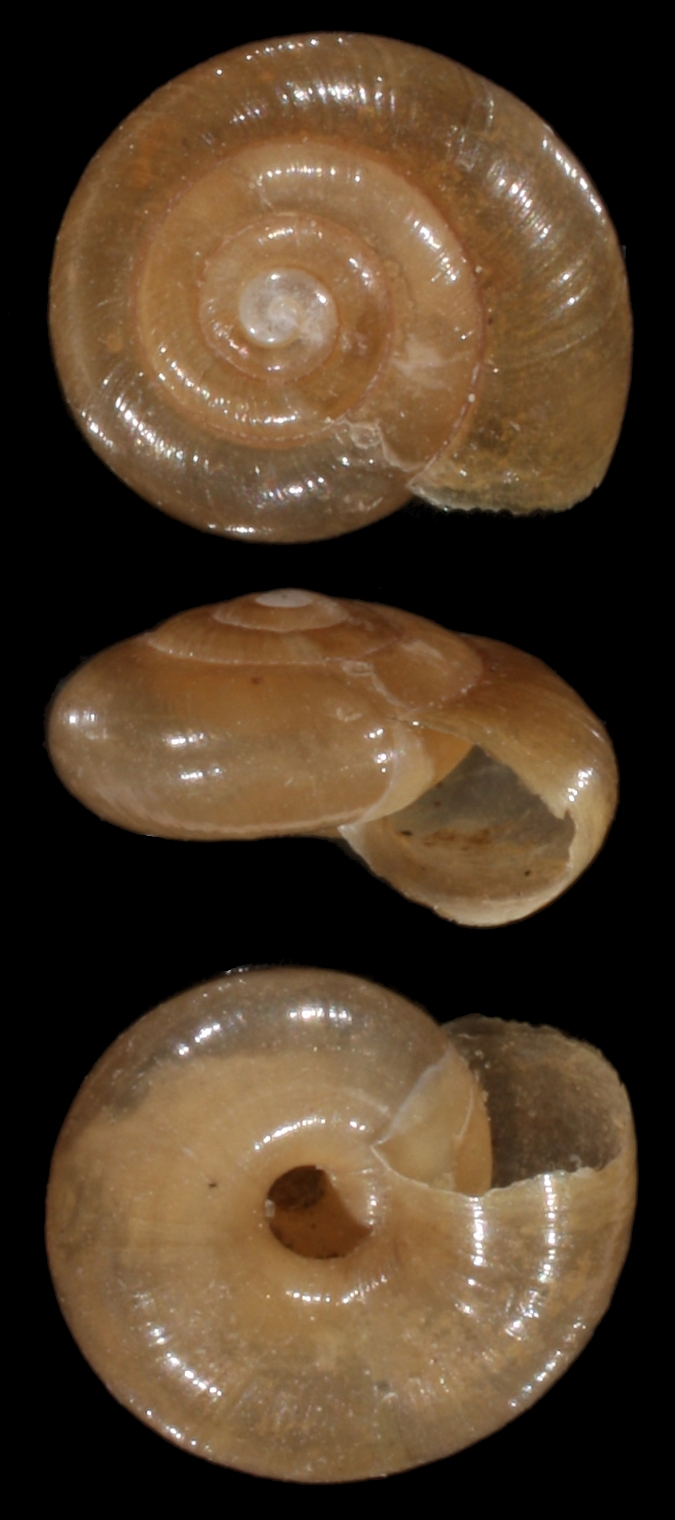
Photo of the shell of Zonitoides nitidus with an
apical view, an apertural view and a basal view

Gastropod shell morphology is usually quite constant among individuals of a species. Controlling variables are:

- The rate of growth per revolution around the coiling axis. High rates give wide-mouthed forms such as the abalone, low rates give highly coiled forms such as Turritella or some of the Planorbidae.
- The shape of the generating curve, roughly equivalent to the shape of the aperture. It may be round, for instance in the turban shell, elongate as in the cone shell or have an irregular shape with a siphonal canal extension, as in the Murex.
- The rate of translation of the generating curve along the axis of coiling, controlling how high-spired the resulting shell becomes. This may range from zero, a flat planispiral shell, to nearly the diameter of the aperture.
- Irregularities or "sculpturing" such as ribs, spines, knobs, and varices made by the snail regularly changing the shape of the generating curve during the course of growth, for instance in the many species of Murex.
- Ontologic growth changes as the animal reaches adulthood. Good examples are the flaring lip of the adult conch and the inward-coiled lip of the cowry.

Some of these factors can be modelled mathematically and programs exist to generate extremely realistic images. Early work by David Raup on the analog computer also revealed many possible combinations that were never adopted by any actual gastropod.

Some shell shapes are found more often in certain environments, though there are many exceptions. Wave-washed high-energy environments, such as the rocky intertidal zone, are usually inhabited by snails whose shells have a wide aperture, a relatively low surface area, and a high growth rate per revolution. High-spired and highly sculptured forms become more common in quiet water environments. The shell of burrowing forms, such as the olive and Terebra, are smooth, elongated, and lack elaborate sculpture, in order to decrease resistance when moving through sand. On land, high-spired forms are often associated with vertical surfaces, whereas flat-shelled snails tend to live on the ground.

A few gastropods, for instance the Vermetidae, cement the shell to, and grow along, solid surfaces such as rocks, or other shells.

== Chirality ==
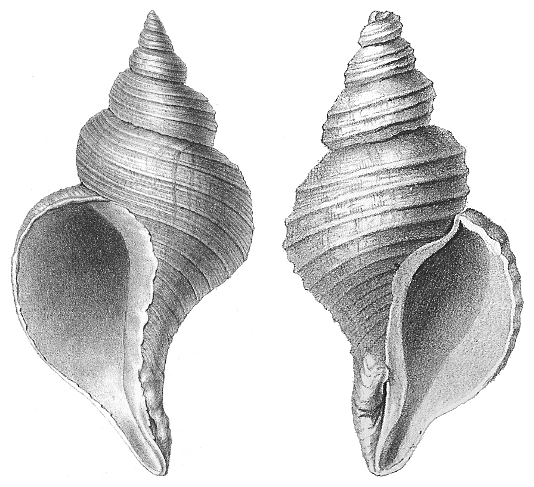
Shells of two different species of sea snail: on the left is the normally sinistral (left-handed) shell of Neptunea angulata, on the right is the normally dextral (right-handed) shell of Neptunea despecta

Most gastropod shells are spirally coiled. The majority (over 90%) of gastropod species have dextral (right-handed) shells, but a small minority of species and genera are virtually always sinistral (left-handed), and a very few species (for example Amphidromus perversus) show a mixture of dextral and sinistral individuals. There occur also aberrantly sinistral forms of dextral species and some of these are highly sought by shell collectors.

Dextral shells coil clockwise as viewed from the apex down; sinistral shells coil counter-clockwise. If a coiled gastropod shell is held with the spire pointing upwards and the aperture more or less facing the observer, a dextral shell will have the aperture on the right-hand side, and a sinistral shell will have the aperture on the left-hand side. This definition can be ambiguous for shells with a very low spire or an unusual axis.

This chirality of gastropods is sometimes overlooked when photographs of coiled gastropods are "flipped" by a non-expert prior to being used in a publication. This image "flipping" results in a normal dextral gastropod appearing to be a rare or abnormal sinistral one.

Sinistrality arose independently 19 times among marine gastropods since the start of the Cenozoic. This left-handedness seems to be more common in freshwater and land pulmonates. But still the dextral living species in gastropods seem to account for 99% of the total number.

The chirality in gastropods appears in early cleavage (spiral cleavage) and the gene NODAL is involved. A more recent study (2013) correlates the asymmetric coiling of the shell by the left-right asymmetric expression of the decapentaplegic gene in the mantle.

=== Mixed coiling populations ===
In a few cases, both left- and right-handed coiling are found in the same population. Sinistral mutants of normally dextral species and dextral mutants of normally sinistral species are rare but well documented occurrences among land snails in general. Populations or species with normally mixed coiling are much rarer, and, so far as is known, are confined, with one exception, to a few genera of arboreal tropical snails. Besides Amphidromus, the Cuban Liguus vittatus (Swainson), Haitian Liguus virgineus (Linnaeus) (family Orthalicidae), some Hawaiian Partulina and many Hawaiian Achatinella (family Achatinellidae), as well as several species of Pacific islands Partula (family Partulidae), are known to have mixed dextral-sinistral populations.

A possible exception may concern some of the European clausiliids of the subfamily Alopiinae. They are obligatory calciphiles living in isolated colonies on limestone outcrops. Several sets of species differ only in the direction of coiling, but the evidence is inconclusive as to whether left- and right-handed shells live together. Soos (1928, pp. 372–385) summarized previous discussions of the problem and concluded that the right- and left-handed populations were distinct species. Others have stated that these populations were not distinct, and the question is far from settled. The Peruvian clausiliid, Nenia callistoglypta Pilsbry (1949, pp. 216–217), also has been described as being an amphidromine species.

The genetics of reverse coiling in a rare dextral mutant of another clausiliid, Alinda biplicata (Montagu), has been studied by Degner (1952). The mechanism is the same as in Radix peregra (Müller), with the direction of coiling determined by a simple Mendelian recessive.

== Standard ways of viewing a shell ==
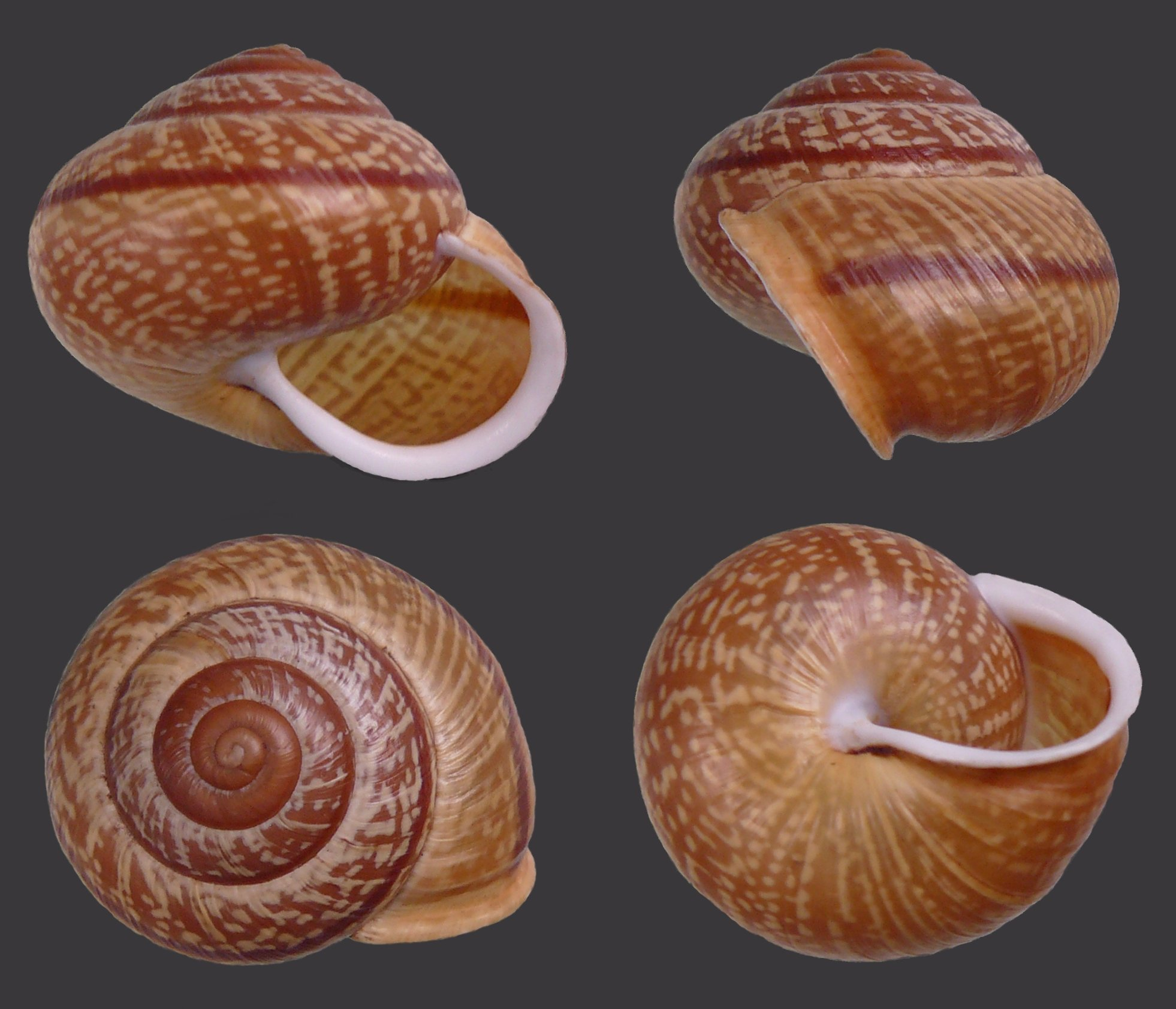
Four views of a shell of Arianta arbustorum: Apertural view (top left), lateral view (top right), apical view (bottom left), and umbilical view (bottom right)

In photographs or illustrations, a gastropod shell can be shown oriented in a number of standard ways:

- apertural view: this is the most common viewing angle. The shell is shown in its entirety, with its aperture facing the viewer, and the apex at the top. If the aperture is on the right side when viewed like this, then the shell-coiling is "right-handed" or dextral; if the aperture is on the left side when viewed like this, the shell has "left-handed" or sinistral shell-coiling.
- abapertural view (or dorsal view): the shell is shown with its aperture 180° away from the viewer, and with the apex at the top.
- umbilical view (or basal view): the shell is shown viewed directly from below. In most cases where there is an umbilicus, this is in clear view.
- apical view: the shell is shown looking down directly onto the apex.

== Description ==
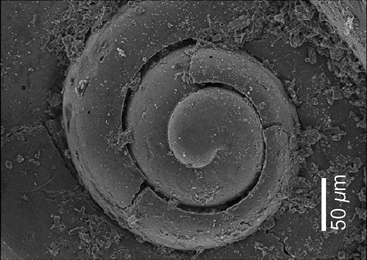
Detail of apical view of the shell of Atlanta lesueurii showing clearly visible protoconch, that has 2¼ whorls

The shell begins with the larval shell, the (usually) minute embryonic whorls known as the protoconch, which is often quite distinct from the rest of the shell and has no growth lines. From the protoconch, which forms the apex of the spire, the coils or whorls of the shell gradually increase in size. Normally the whorls are circular or elliptical in section. The spire can be high or low, broad or slender, according to the way the coils of the shell are arranged, and the apical angle of the shell varies accordingly. The whorls sometimes rest loosely upon one another (as in Epitonium scalare). They also can overlap the earlier whorls such that the earlier whorls may be largely or wholly covered by the later ones. When an angulation occurs, the space between it and the suture above it constitutes the area known as the "shoulder" of the shell. The shoulder angle may be smooth or keeled, and may sometimes have nodes or spines.

The most simple form of sculpture of the gastropod shell consists of longitudinal ridges, and/or transverse ridges. Primary spirals may appear in regular succession on either side of the first primary, which generally becomes the shoulder angle if angulation occurs. Secondary spirals may appear by intercalation between the primary ones, and generally are absent in the young shell, except in some highly accelerated types. Tertiary spirals are intercalated between the preceding groups in more specialized species. Ribs are regular transverse foldings of the shell, which generally extend from the suture to suture. They are usually spaced uniformly and crossed by the spirals. In specialized types, when a shoulder angle is formed, they become concentrated as nodes upon this angle, disappearing from the shoulder above and the body below. Spines may replace the nodes in later stages. They form as notches in the margin of the shell and are subsequently abandoned, often remaining open in front. Irregular spines may also arise on various parts of the surface of the shell (see Platyceras).

When a row of spines is formed at the edge or outer lip of the shell during a resting period, this feature sometimes remains behind as a varix as in (Murex) and many of the Ranellidae. Varices may also be formed by simple expansion of the outer lip, and a subsequent resumption of growth from the base of the expansion.

The aperture or peristome of the shell may be simple or variously modified. An outer and an inner (columellar) lip are generally recognized. These may be continuous with each other, or may be divided by an anterior notch. This, in some types (Fusinus, etc.) it is drawn out into an anterior siphonal canal, of greater or lesser length.

An upper or posterior notch is present in certain taxa, and this may result in the formation of a ridge or shelf next to the suture (Clavilithes). An outer (lateral) emargination or notch, sometimes prolonged into a slit occurs in certain types (Pleurotomidae, Pleurotomaridae, Bellerophontidae, etc.), and the progressive closing of this slit may give rise to a definitely marked slit band. In some cases the slit is abandoned and left as a hole (Fissurellidae), or by periodic renewal as a succession of holes (Haliotis). The outer emargination is often only indicated by the reflected course of the lines of growth on the shell.

On the inside of the outer lip, various ridges or plications called lirae are sometimes found, and these occasionally may be strong and tooth-like (Nerinea). Similar ridges or columellar plicae or folds are more often found on the inner lip, next to the columella or central spiral twist. These may be oblique or normal to the axis of coiling (horizontal), few or numerous, readily seen, or far within the shell so as to be invisible except in broken shells. When the axis of coiling is hollow (perforate spire) the opening at the base constitutes the umbilicus. The umbilicus varies greatly in size, and may be wholly or in part covered by an expansion or callus of the inner lip (Natica).

Many recent shells, when the animal is alive or the shell is freshly empty, have an uppermost shell layer of horny, smooth, or hairy epidermis or periostracum, a proteinaceous layer which sometimes is thick enough to hide the color markings of the surface of the shell. The periostracum, as well as the coloration, is only rarely preserved in fossil shells.

The apertural end of the gastropod shell is the anterior end, nearest to the head of the animal; the apex of the spire is often the posterior end or at least is the dorsal side. Most authors figure the shells with the apex of the spire uppermost. In life, when the soft parts of these snail are retracted, in some groups the aperture of the shell is closed by using a horny or calcareous operculum, a door-like structure which is secreted by, and attached to, the upper surface of the posterior part of the foot. The operculum is of very variable form in the different groups of snails that possess one.

== Parts of the shell ==
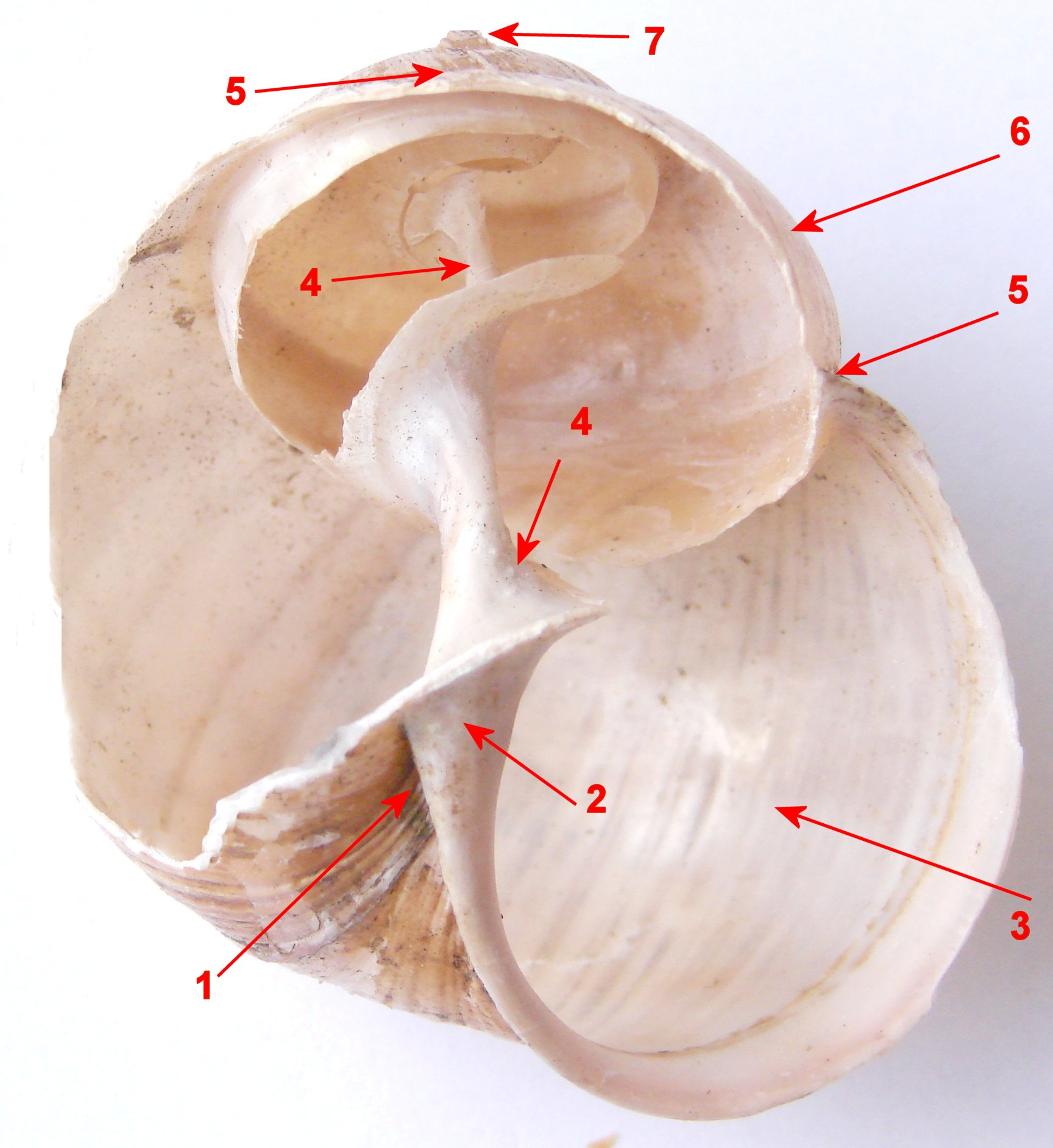
The shell of a large land snail (probably Helix pomatia) with parts broken off to show the interior structure. 1 – umbilicus 2 – columellar plait 3 – aperture 4 – columella 5 – suture 6 – body whorl 7 – apex

The terminology used to describe the shells of gastropods includes:

- Aperture: the opening of the shell
- Lip: peristome: the margin of the aperture
- Apex: the smallest few whorls of the shell
- Body whorl (or last whorl): the largest whorl in which the main part of the visceral mass of the mollusk is found
- Columella: the "little column" at the axis of revolution of the shell
- Operculum: the "trapdoor" of the shell
- Funicle: a cord-like spiral ridge within the umbilical area of the shell that runs into or partly fills the umbilicus.
- Parietal callus: a ridge on the inner lip of the aperture in certain gastropods
- Periostracum: a thin layer of organic "skin" which forms the outer layer of the shell of many species
- Peristome: the part of the shell that is right around the aperture, also known as the lip
- Plait: folds on the columella.
- Protoconch: the nuclear or embryonic whorl; the larval shell, often remains in position even on an adult shell
- Sculpture: ornamentation on the outer surface of a shell
  - Lira: raised lines or ridges on the surface of the shell
- Siphonal canal: an extension of the aperture in certain gastropods
- Spire: the part of the shell above the body whorl.
- Suture: The junction between whorls of most gastropods
- Teleoconch : the entire shell without the protoconch; the postnuclear whorls.
- Umbilicus: in shells where the whorls move apart as they grow, on the underside of the shell there is a deep depression reaching up towards the spire; this is the umbilicus
- Varix: on some mollusk shells, spaced raised and thickened vertical ribs mark the end of a period of rapid growth; these are varices
- Whorl: each one of the complete rotations of the shell spiral

== Shape of the shell ==
The overall shape of the shell varies. For example, three groups can be distinguished based on the height – width ratio:

- oblong – the height is much bigger than the width
- globose or conical shell – the height and the width of the shell are approximately the same
- depressed – the width is much bigger than the height
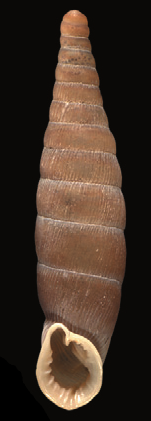
oblong shell of Bulgarica denticulata

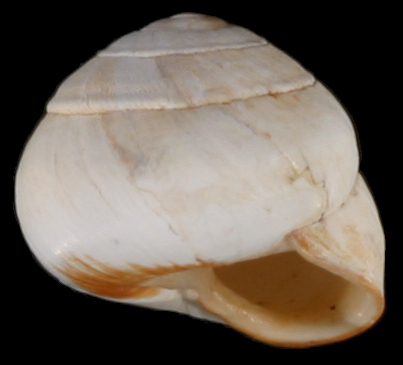
globose shell of Sphincterochila candidissima

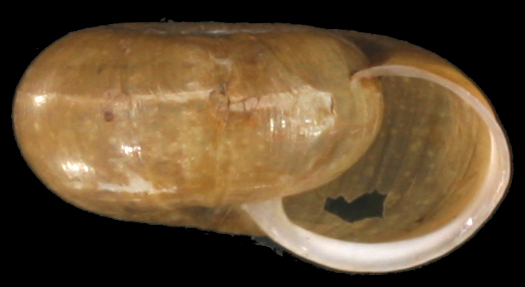
depressed shell of Escargot de Quimper

The following are the principal modifications of form in the gastropod shell.

- Regularly spiral:
  - Bulloid: bubble-shaped Bulla
  - Coeloconoid a slightly concave conical shell in which the incremental angle increases steadily during growth (see: Calliostoma)
  - Cone-shaped, obconic. Conus
  - Contabulate, short, with shouldered whorls
  - Convolute: aperture as long as the shell, nearly or quite concealing the spire. Cypraea
  - Cylindrical, pupiform. Lioplax, Pupa
  - Cyrtoconoid: approaching a conical shape but with convex sides (see: Gibbula)
  - Depressed, lenticular. Ethalia carneolata
  - Discoidal. Elachorbis
  - Ear-shaped. Haliotis
  - Elongated, subulate, elevated. Terebra
  - Few-whorled. Helix pomatia.
  - Fusiform, spindle-shaped; thick in the middle, the ends tapering Fusinus
  - Gibbous. Whorls swelled beyond the normal contour of increase (usually on the aperture side ). Streptaxis.
  - Globular. Natica
  - Imperforate: without any hollow or hole
  - Inflected: bent inwards
  - Irregular: or of no regular, equal or determinate form
  - Laciniated: as if irregularly cut or lacerated
  - Linear: very narrow and of equal breath
  - Lobe: a notched division
  - Many-whorled. Millerelix peregrina.
  - Opaque: not transparent
  - Orbicular: nearly round
  - Reflected: bent outwards
  - Reticular: resembling network
  - Short, bucciniform. Buccinum
  - Sinuated: taking a bend inwards
  - Spatulate: spoon-shaped
  - Striated: marked by raised or indented lines
  - Symmetrical: proportionate, the sides or parts equal
  - Transverse: cross-ways
  - Trochiform, pyramidal, conical with a flat base. Trochus
  - Tubular: pipe or tube-like: hollow within
  - Truncate: ending abruptly as if cut off
  - Tumid: swelled or bulged
  - Turbinated: conical, with rounded base. Turbo
  - Turreted, turriculate, babylonic; an elongated shell with the whorls angulated or shouldered on their upper part. Turritella
  - Scalariform, whorls not impinging. Epitonium scalare
- Irregularly spiral, evolute. Siliquaria, Vermetus
- Tubular.
- Shield-shaped. Umbraculum
- Boat-shaped, slipper-shaped. Crepidula
- Conical or limpet-shaped. Patella
- Biconic: shaped like two conical shapes that are touching their bases, and tapering at both ends: Fasciolaria tulipa
- Pear-shaped: a combination of two shapes: ovate-conic and conic. Ficus

Detailed distinction of the shape can be:

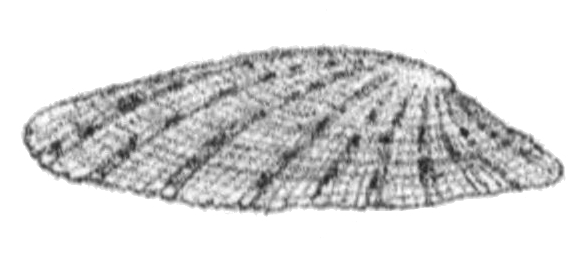
cap shape

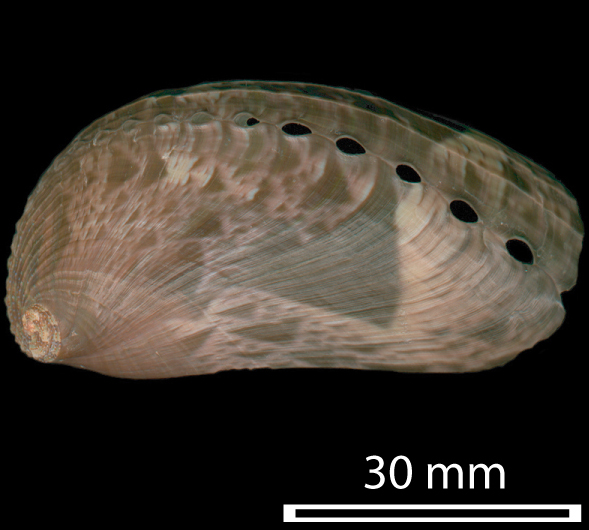
ear shape

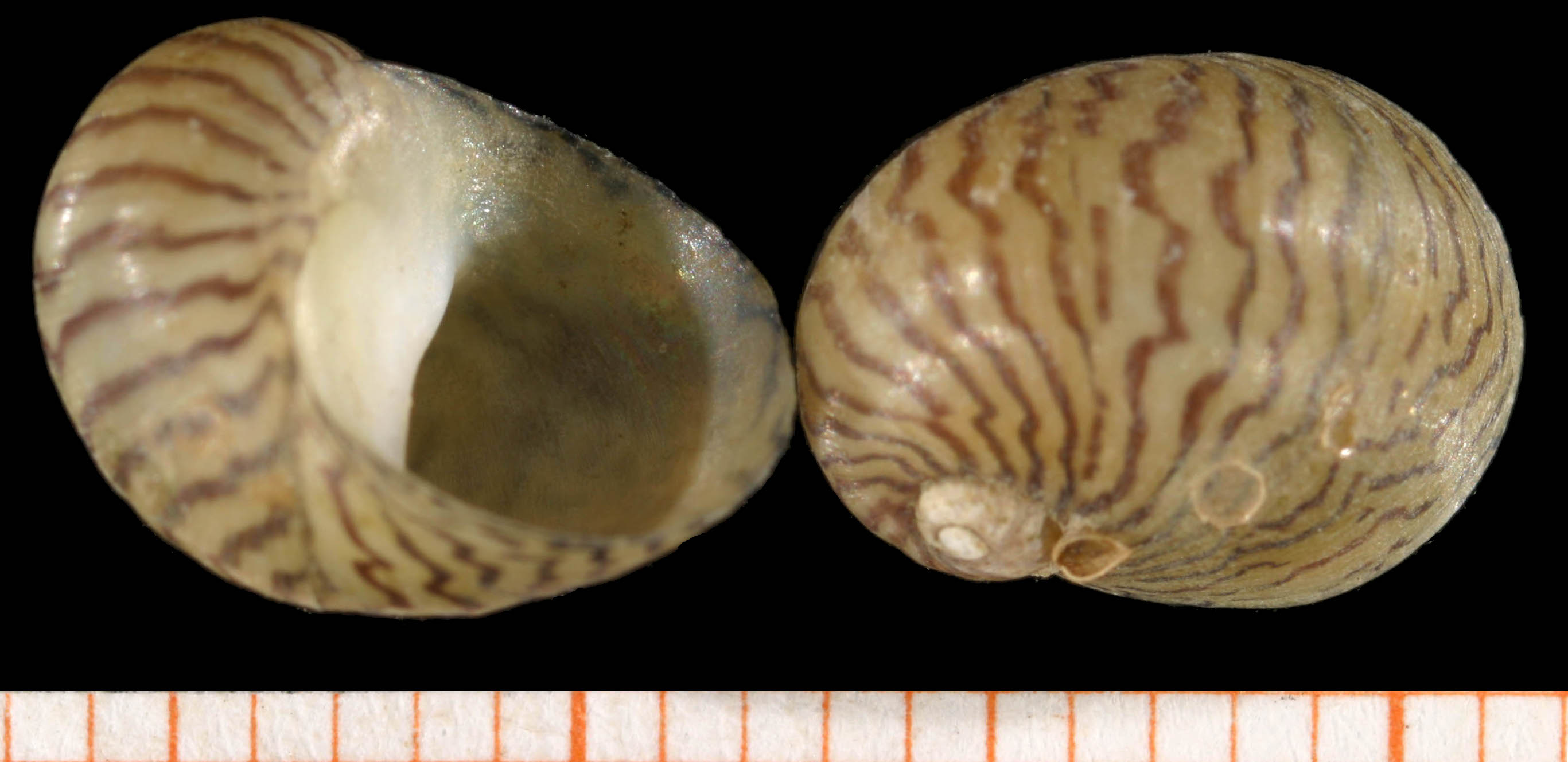
neritiform

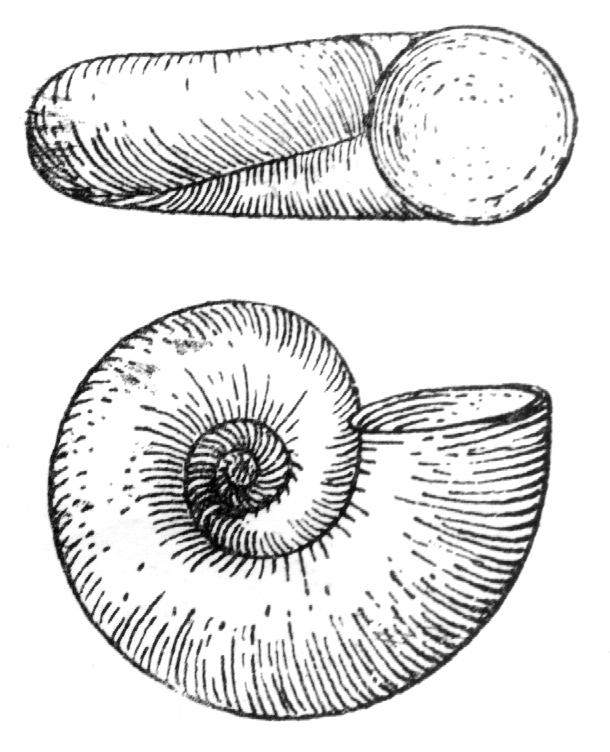
planispiral

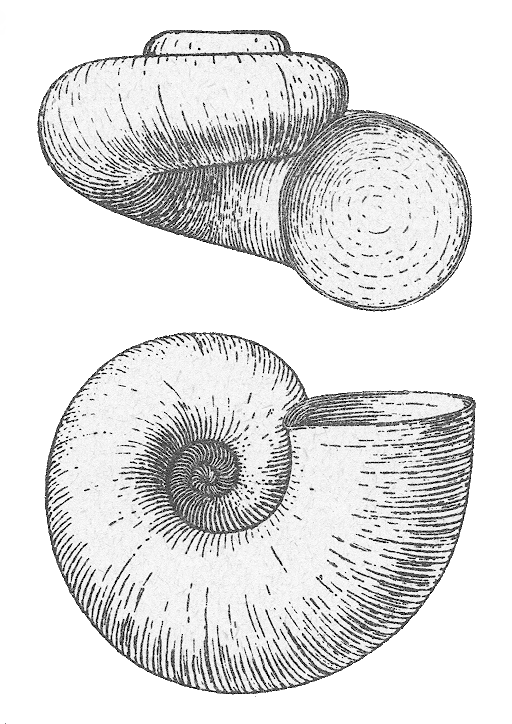
depressed trochiform or valvatiform

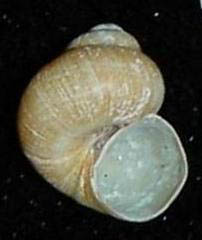
trochiform

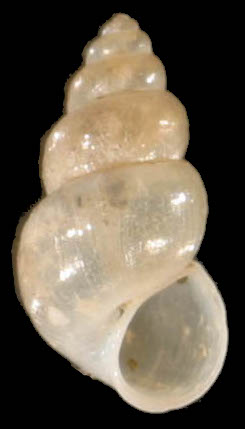
ovate-conic

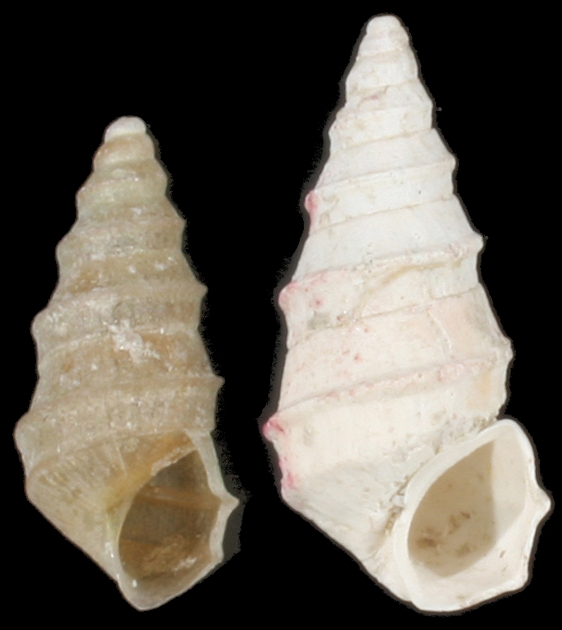
conic

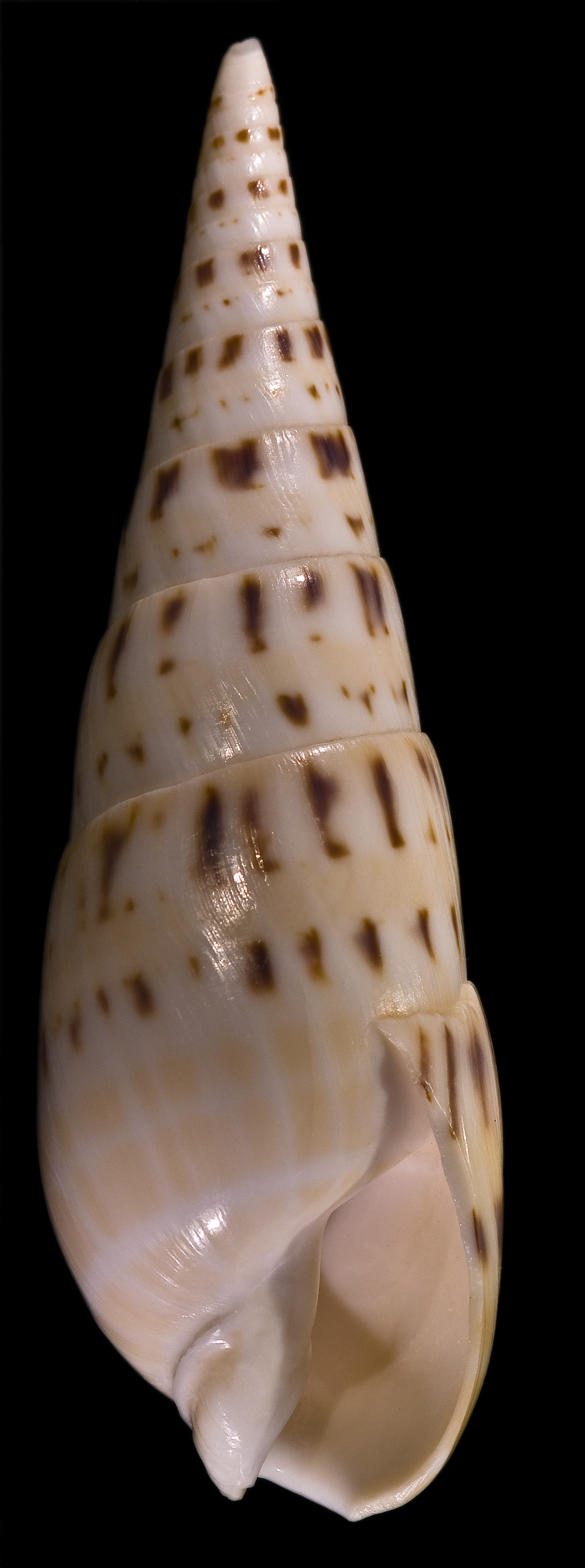
elongate-conic or turriform or cockscrew shape

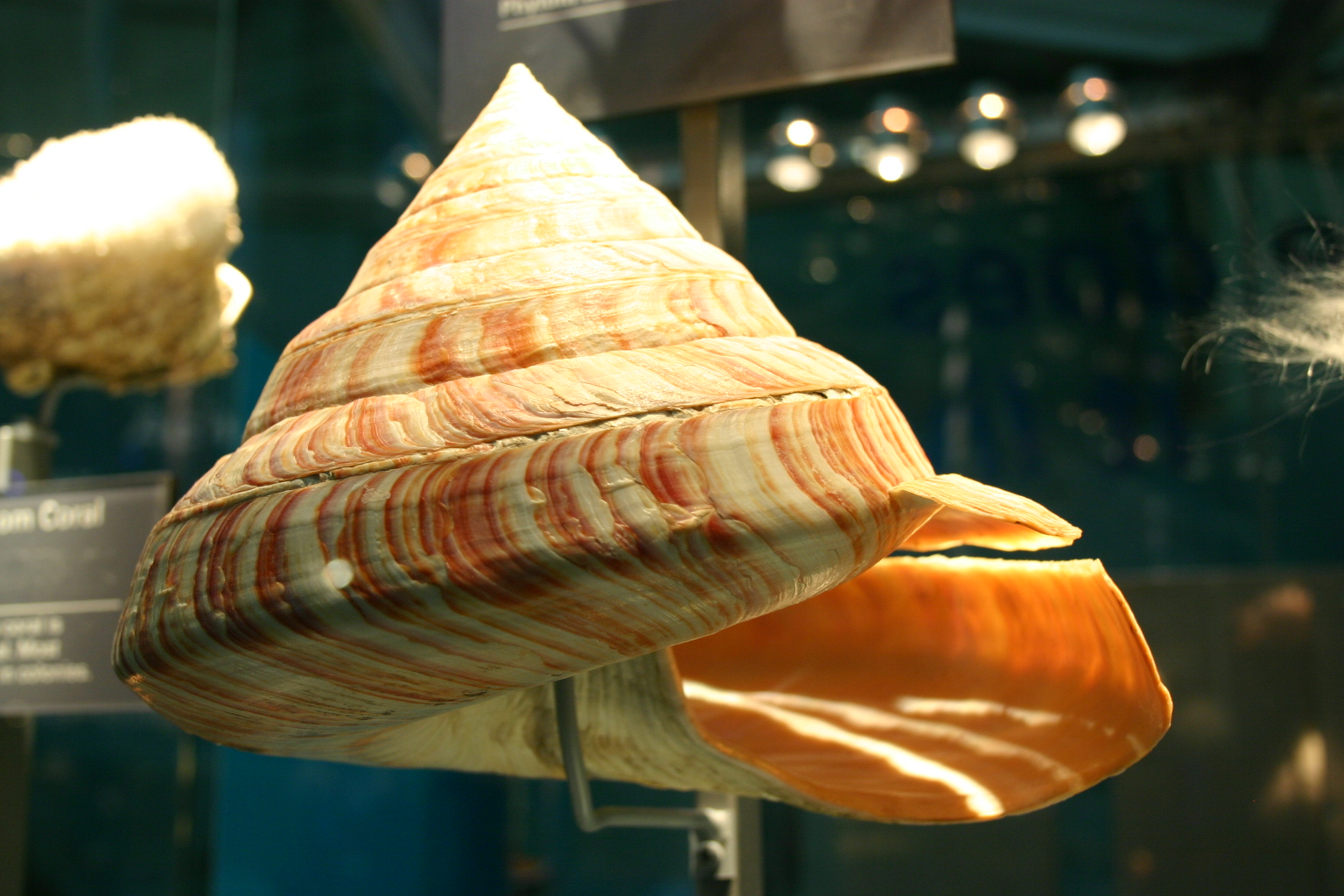
top shape

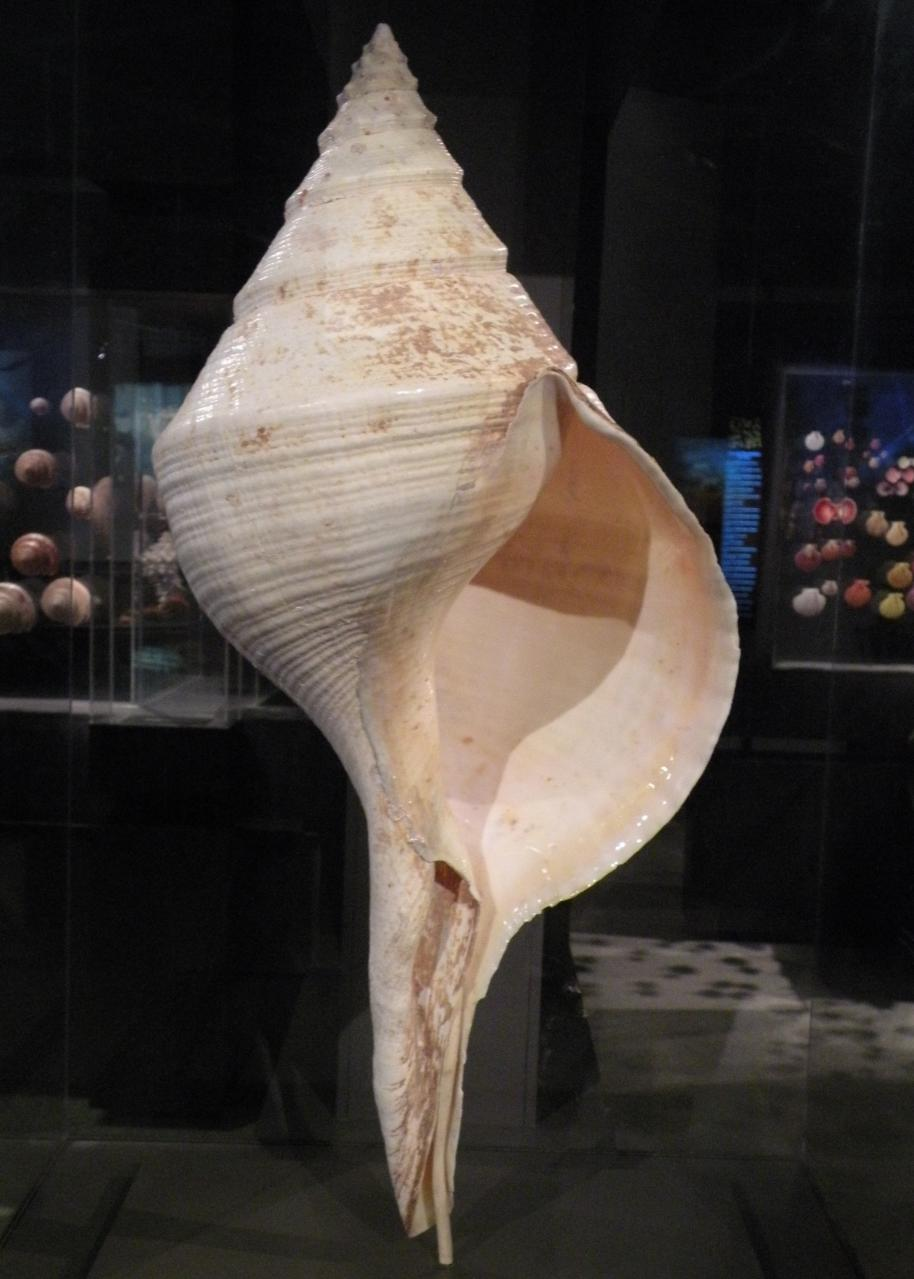
spindle shape – the sea snail Syrinx aruanus has the largest shell of any living gastropod.

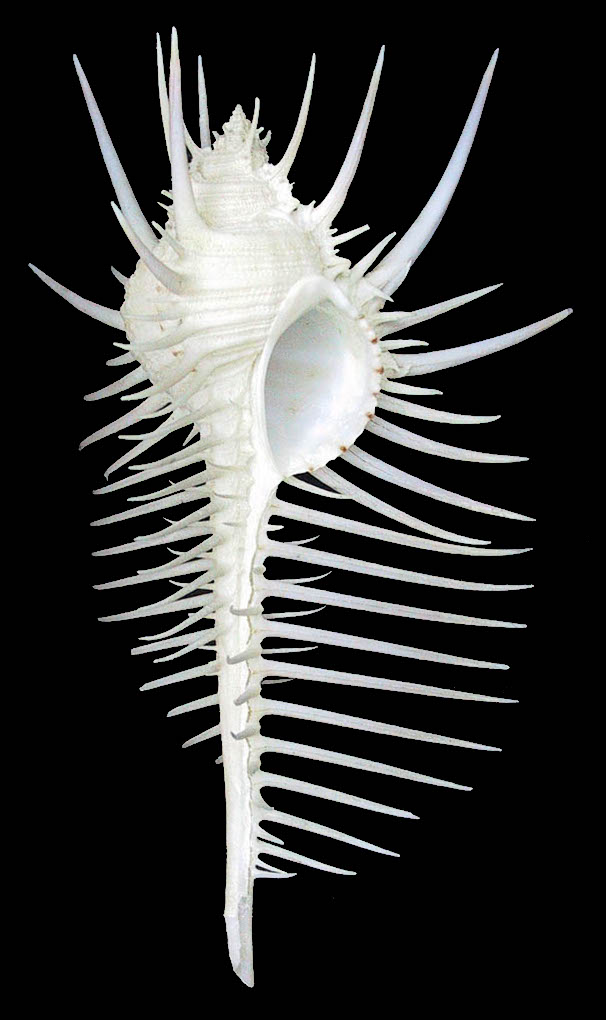
club shape - Venus Comb Murex

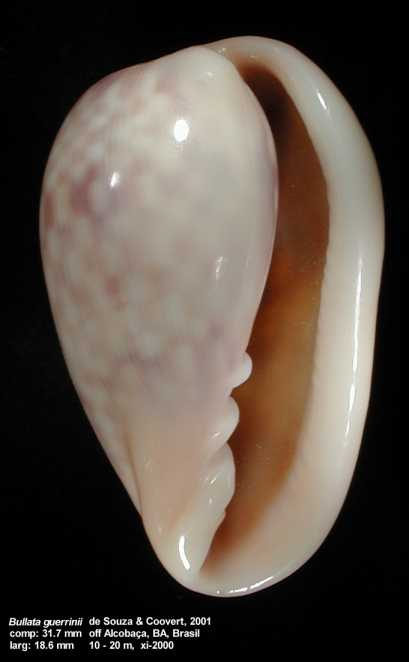
egg shape

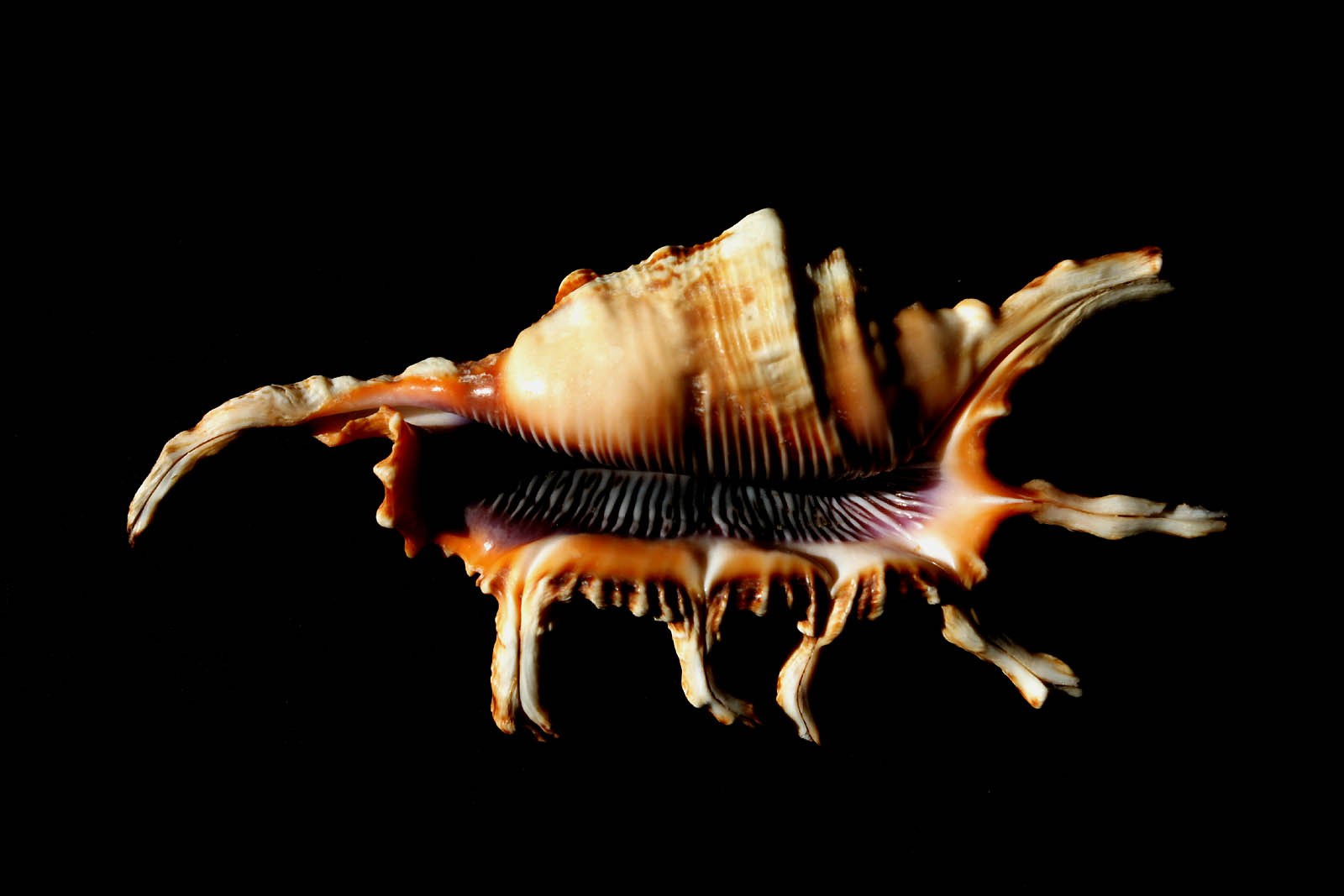
irregular shape

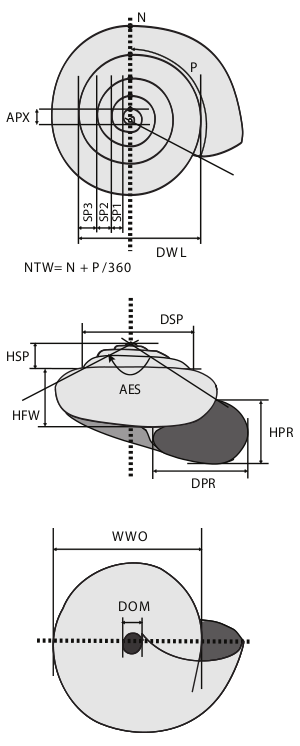
Schematic representation of the apical, apertural and basal view of a shell, showing 14 different commonly used measurements. Dotted lines represent the orientation axes (except of lower image).

== Dimensions ==
The most frequently used measurements of a gastropod shell are: the height of the shell, the width of the shell, the height of the aperture and the width of the aperture. The number of whorls is also often used.

In this context, the height (or the length) of a shell is its maximum measurement along the central axis. The width (or breadth, or diameter) is the maximum measurement of the shell at right angles to the central axis. Both terms are only related to the description of the shell and not to the orientation of the shell on the living animal.

The largest height of any shell is found in the marine snail species Syrinx aruanus, which can be up to 91 cm.

The central axis is an imaginary axis along the length of a shell, around which, in a coiled shell, the whorls spiral. The central axis passes through the columella, the central pillar of the shell.

== Evolutionary changes ==
Among proposed roles invoked for the variability of shells during evolution include mechanical stability, defense against predators and climatic selection.

The shells of some gastropods have been reduced or partly reduced during their evolution. This reduction can be seen in all slugs, in semi-slugs and in various other marine and non-marine gastropods. Sometimes the reduction of the shell is associated with a predatory way of feeding.

Some taxa lost the coiling of their shell during evolution. According to Dollo's law, it is not possible to regain the coiling of the shell after it is lost. Despite that, there are few genera in the family Calyptraeidae that changed their developmental timing (heterochrony) and gained back (re-evolution) a coiled shell from the previous condition of an uncoiled limpet-like shell.

== Taphonomic implications ==
In large enough quantities, gastropod shells can have enough of an impact on environmental conditions to affect the ability of organic remains in the local environment to fossilize. For example, in the Dinosaur Park Formation, fossil hadrosaur eggshell is rare. This is because the breakdown of tannins from local coniferous vegetation would have caused the ancient waters to become acidic. Eggshell fragments are present in only two microfossil sites, both of which are predominated by the preserved shells of invertebrate life, including gastropods. It was the slow dissolution of these shells releasing calcium carbonate into the water that raised the water's pH high enough to prevent the eggshell fragments from dissolving before they could be fossilized.

== Variety of forms ==
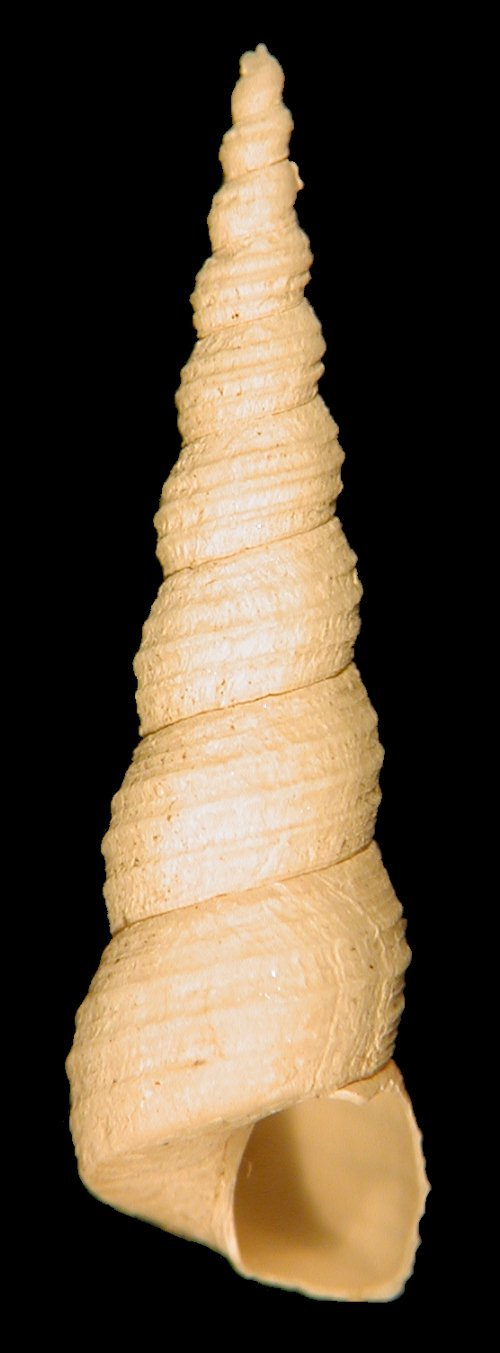
Turritella communis, many-whorled shell of tower snail

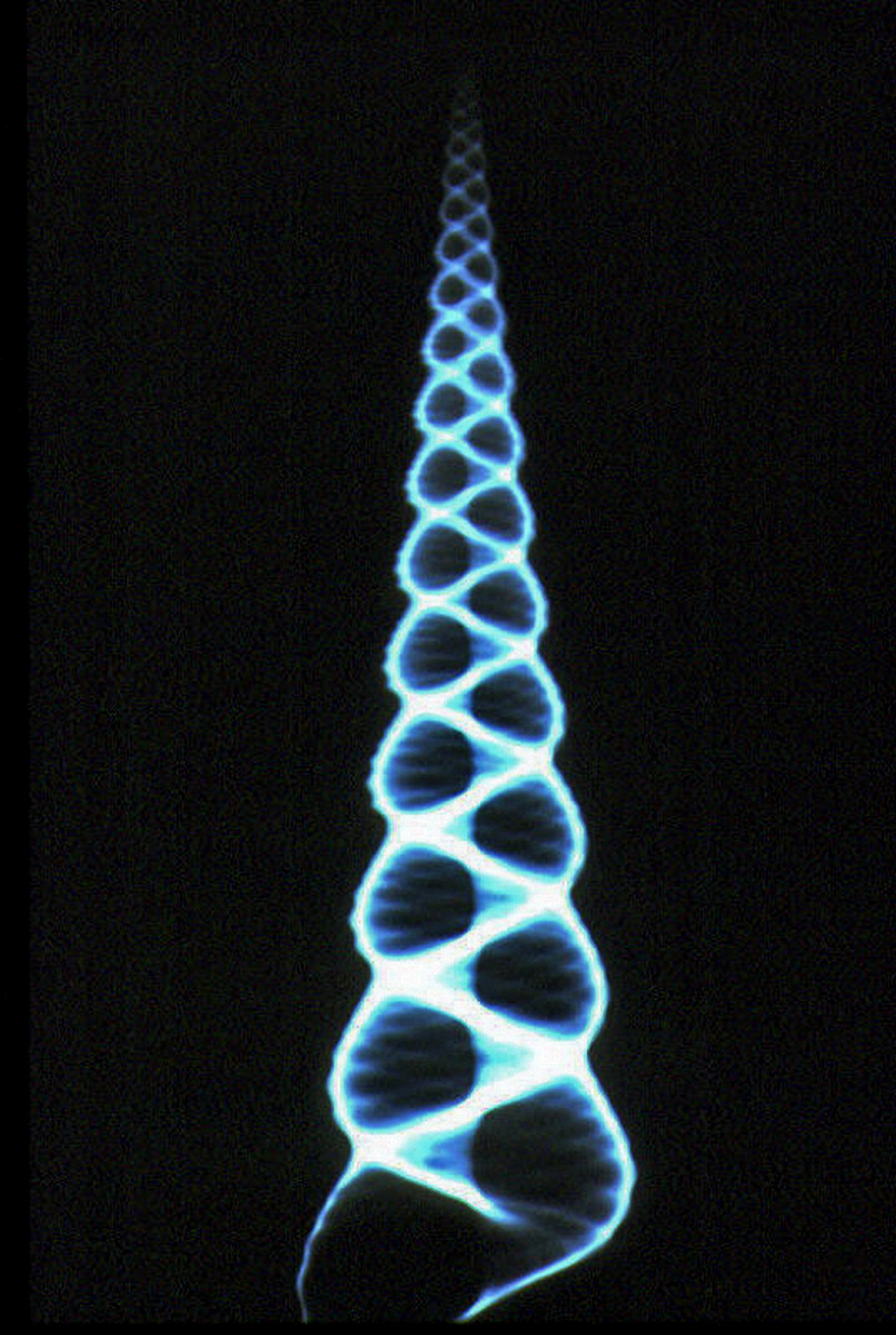
X-ray image of Turritella

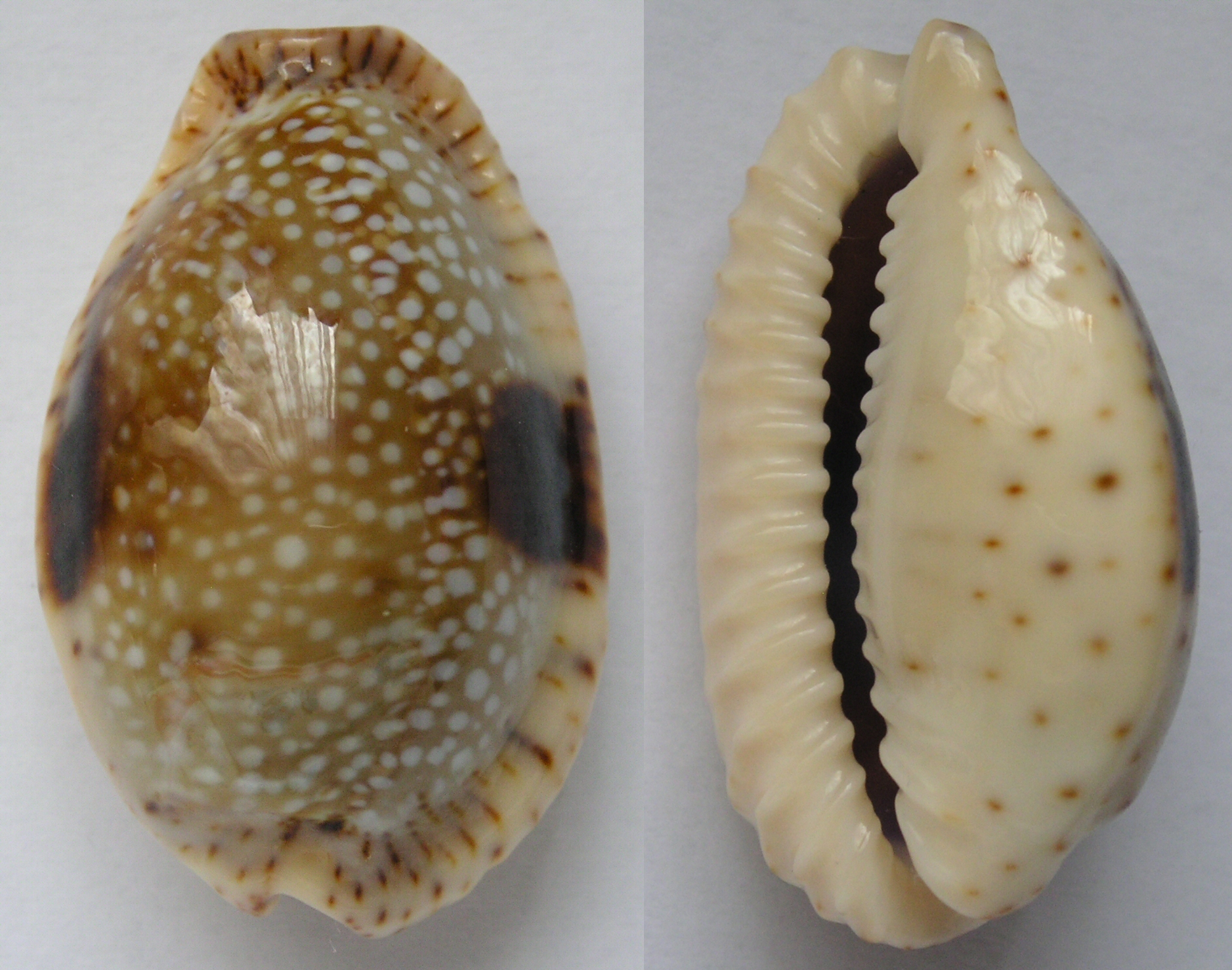
Shell of marine cowry snail – Cypraea nebrites

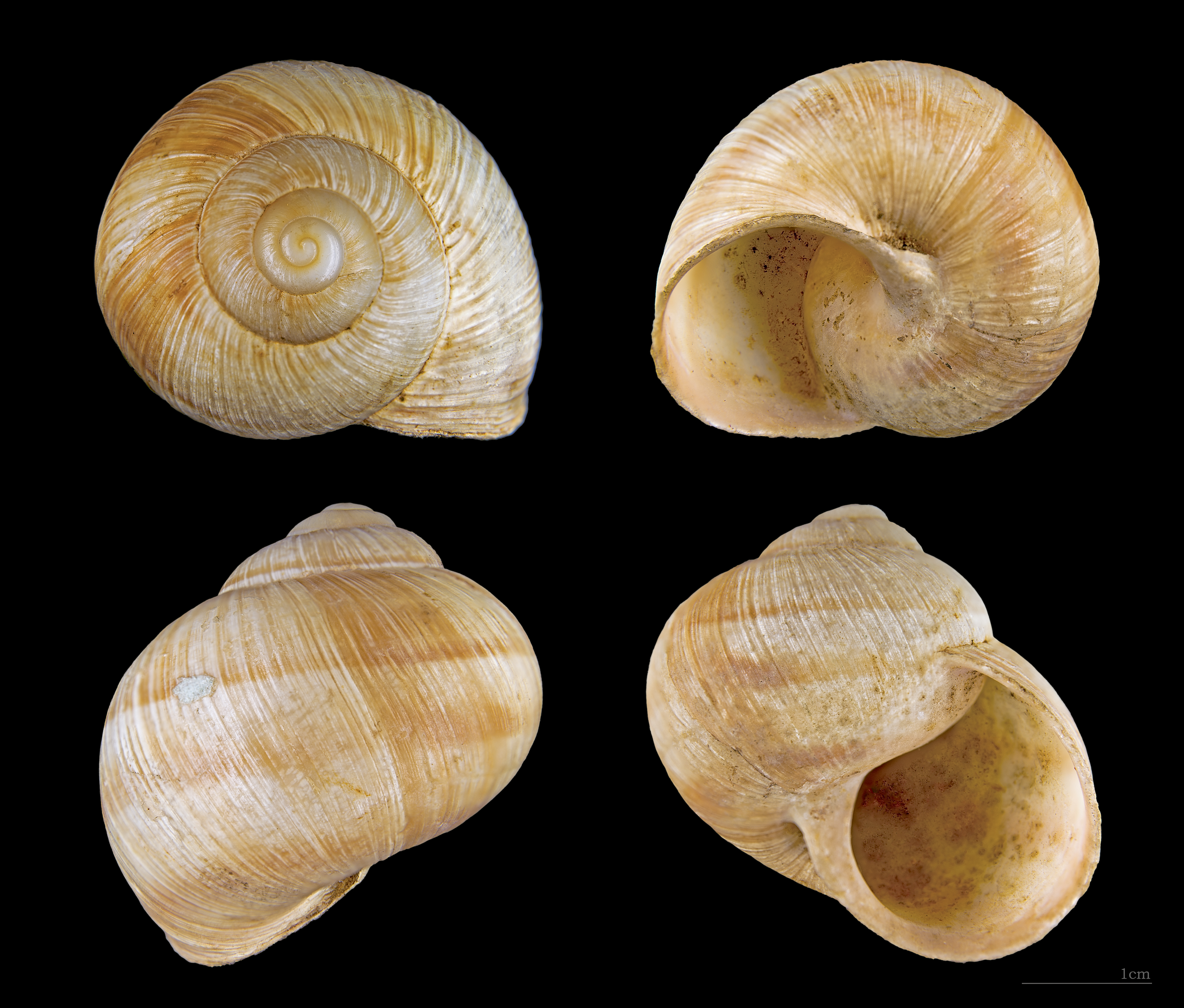
Helix pomatia

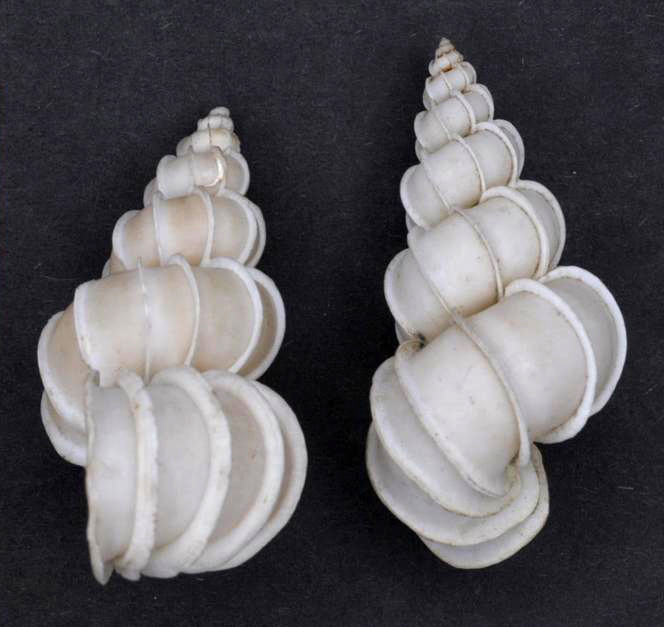
Epitonium scalare spiral shell

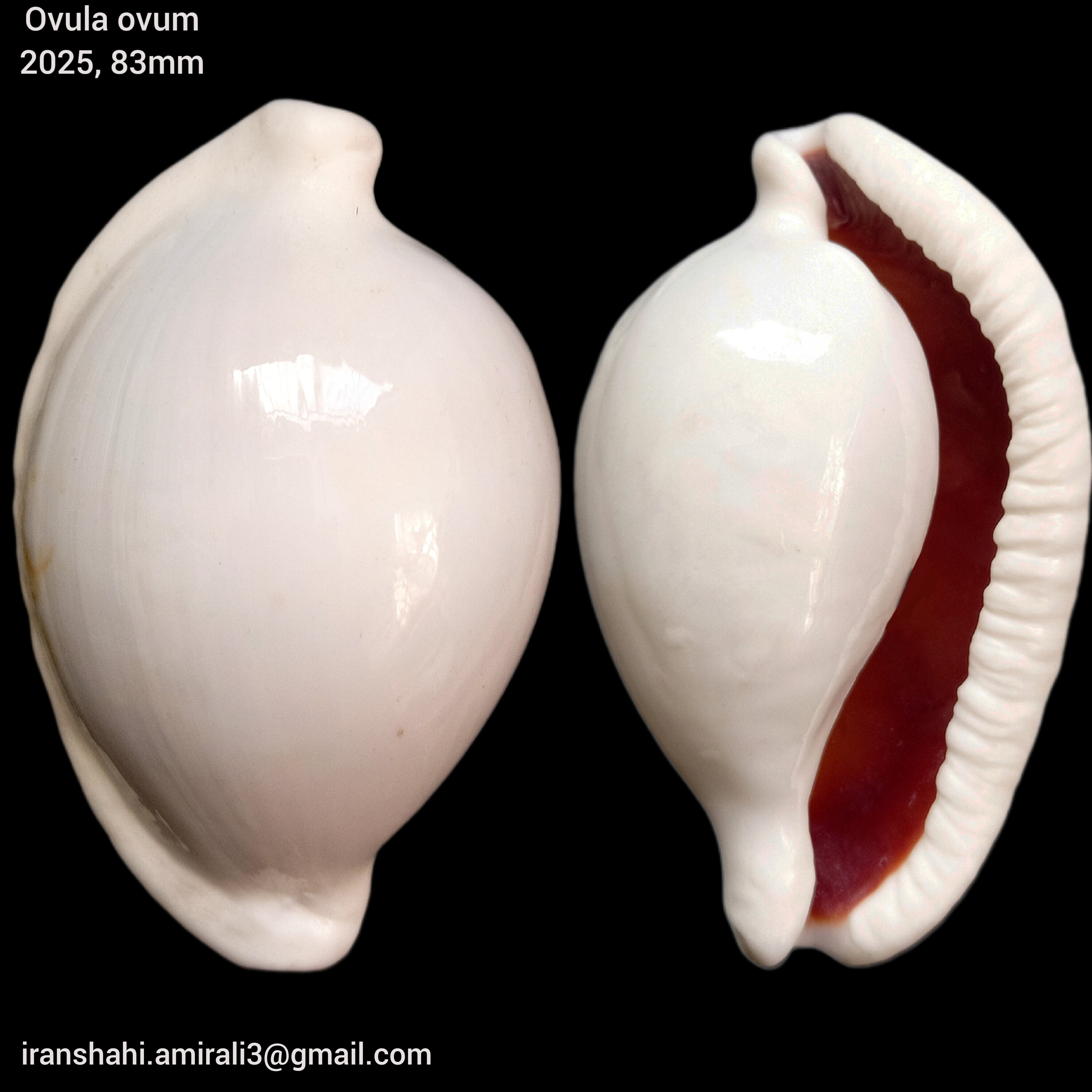
Ovula ovum
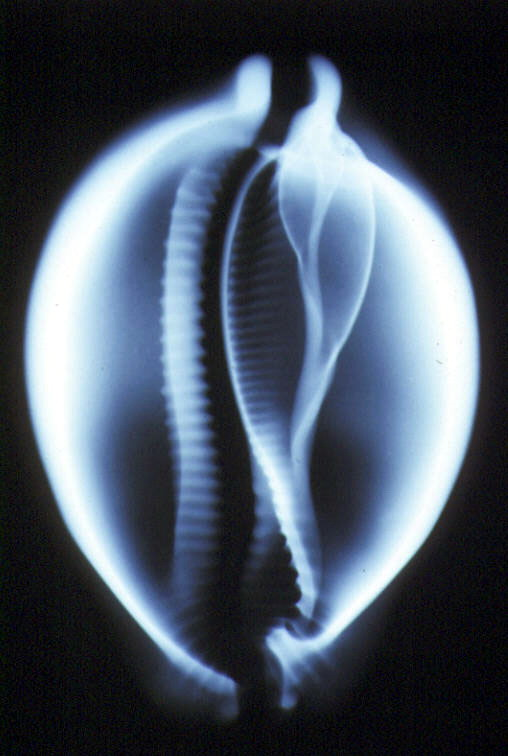
X-ray image of Cypraea

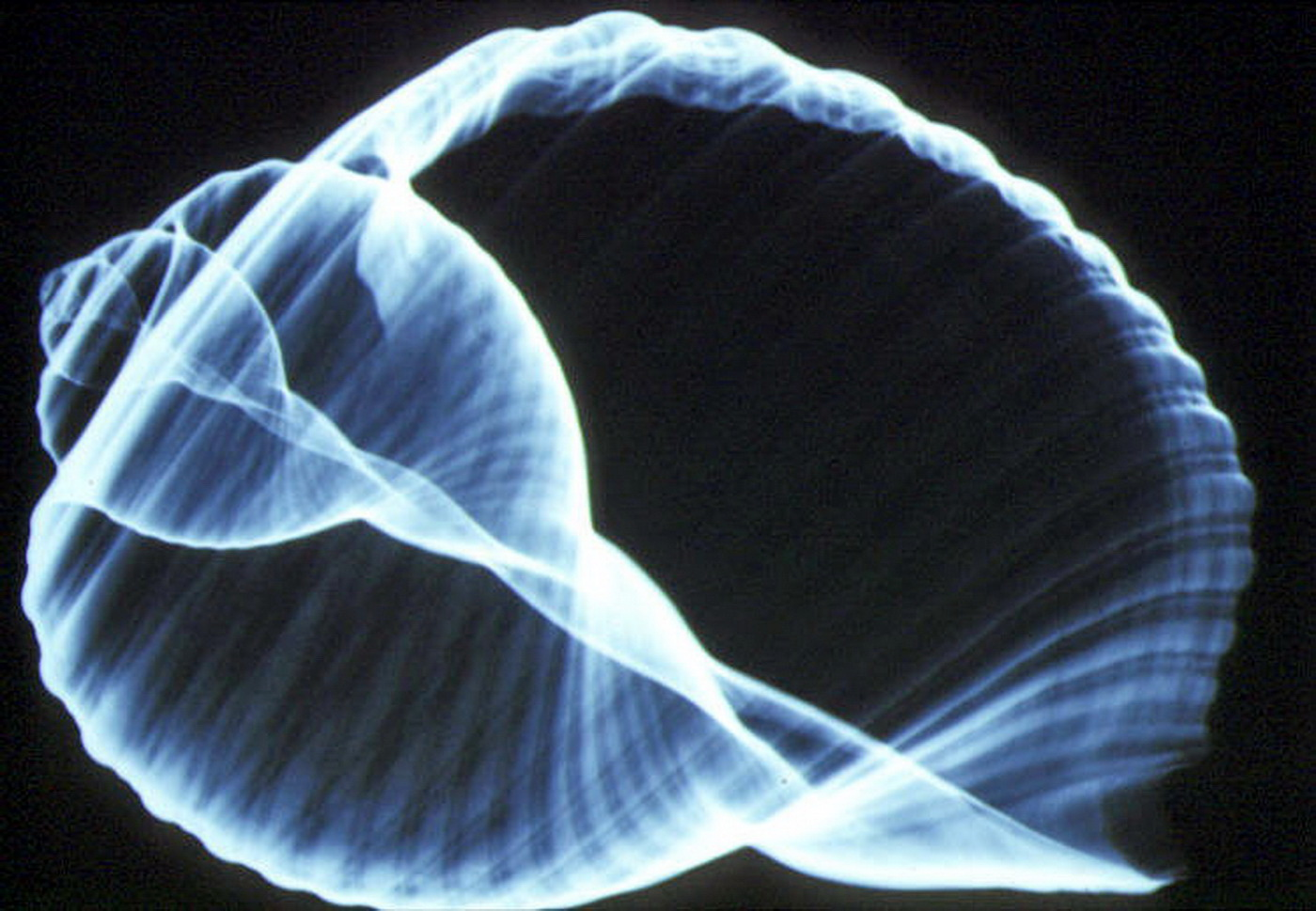
X-ray image of the shell of Tonna galea

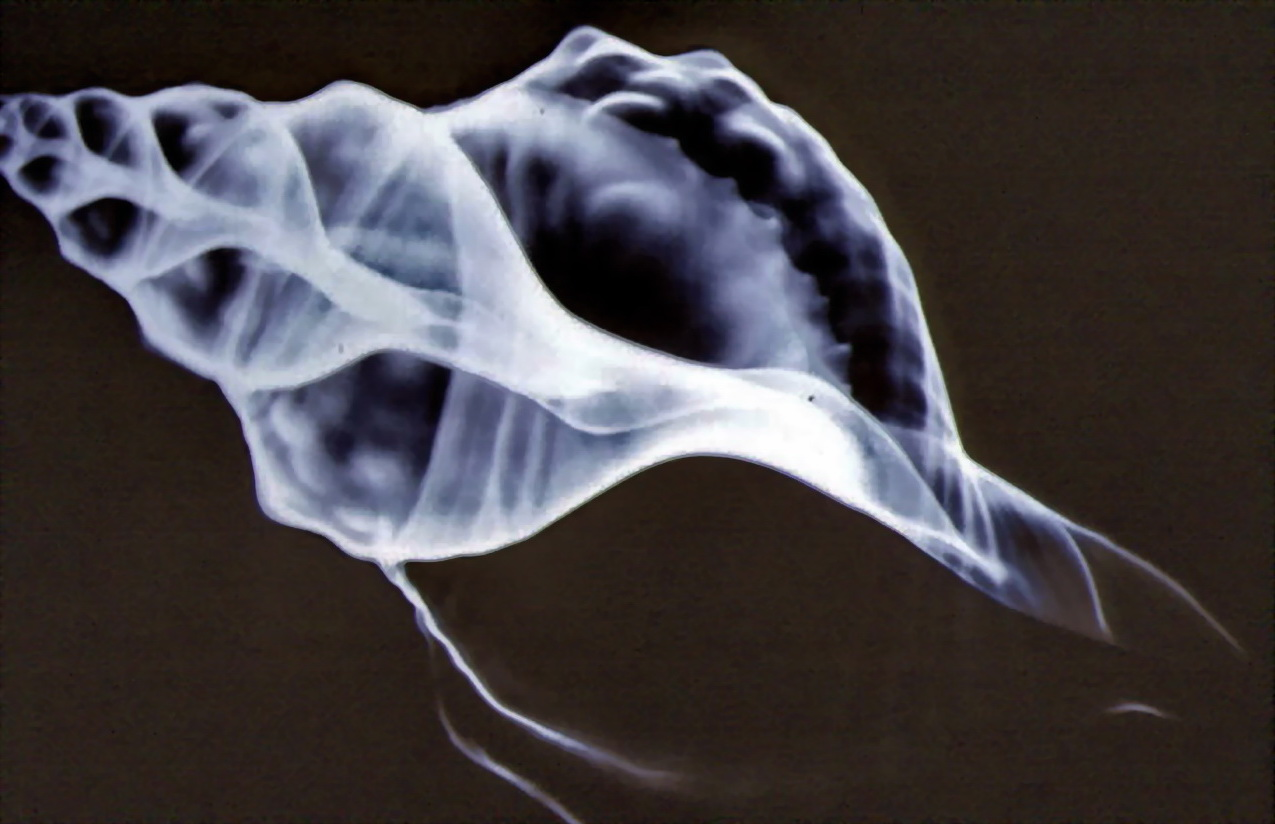
Charonia

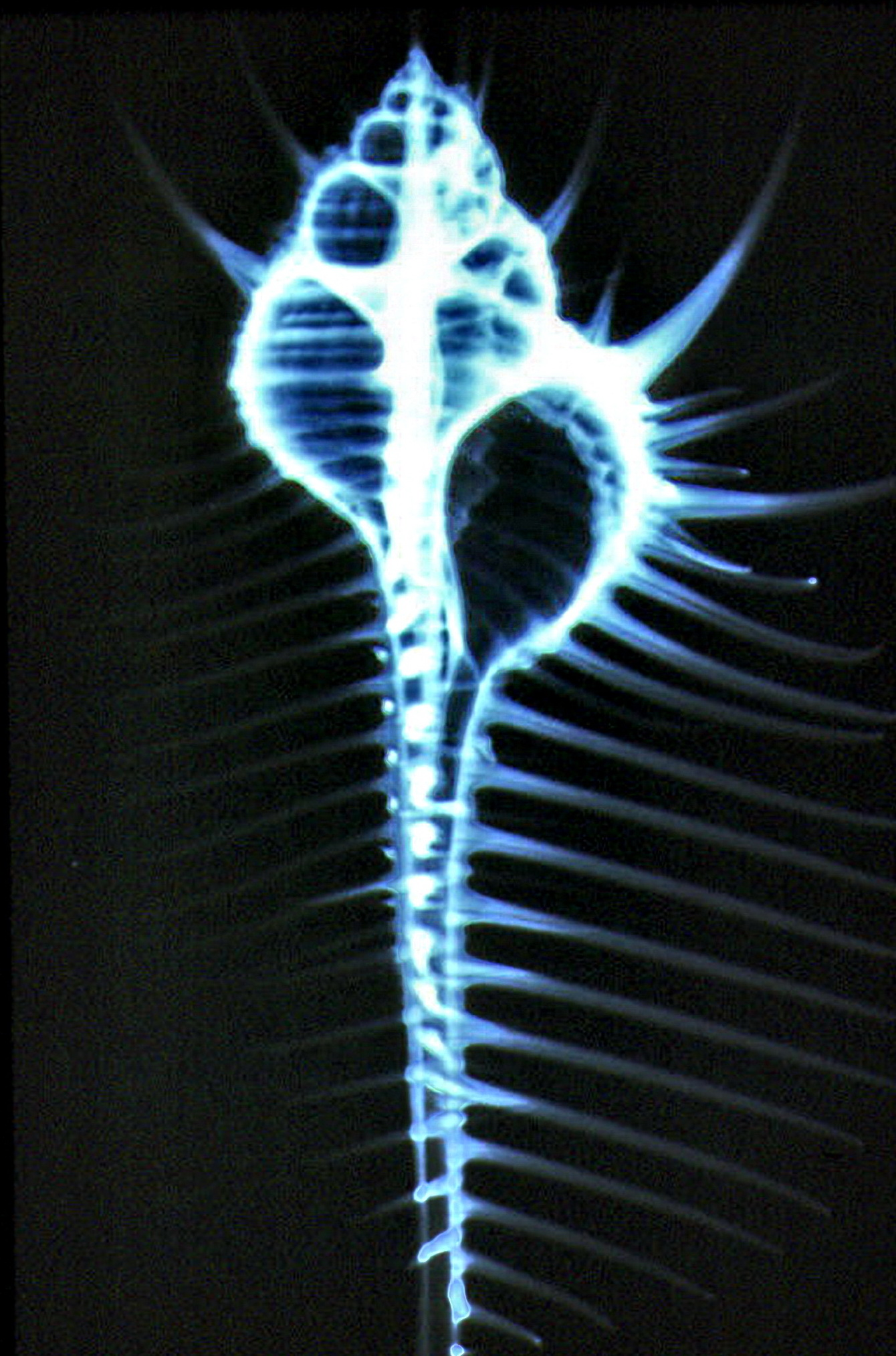
Murex pecten

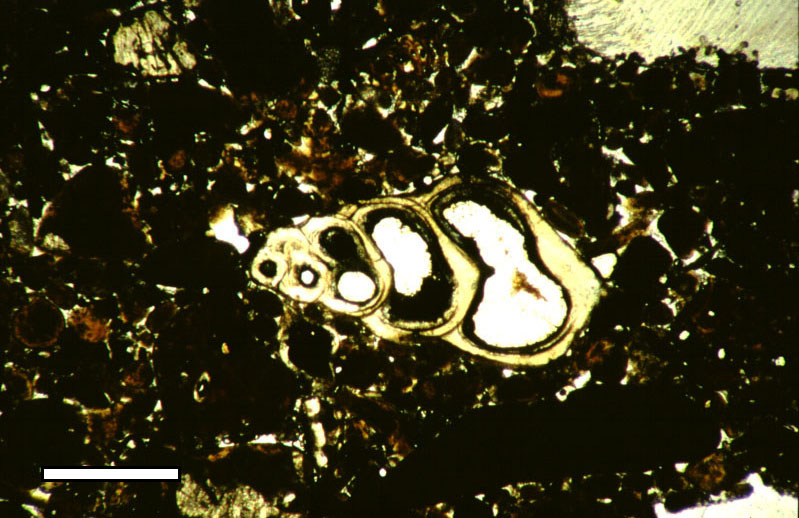
Thin section in plane-polarized light of microscopic gastropod shell, from Holocene lagoonal sediment of Rice Bay, San Salvador Island, Bahamas. Scale bar 500 μm.

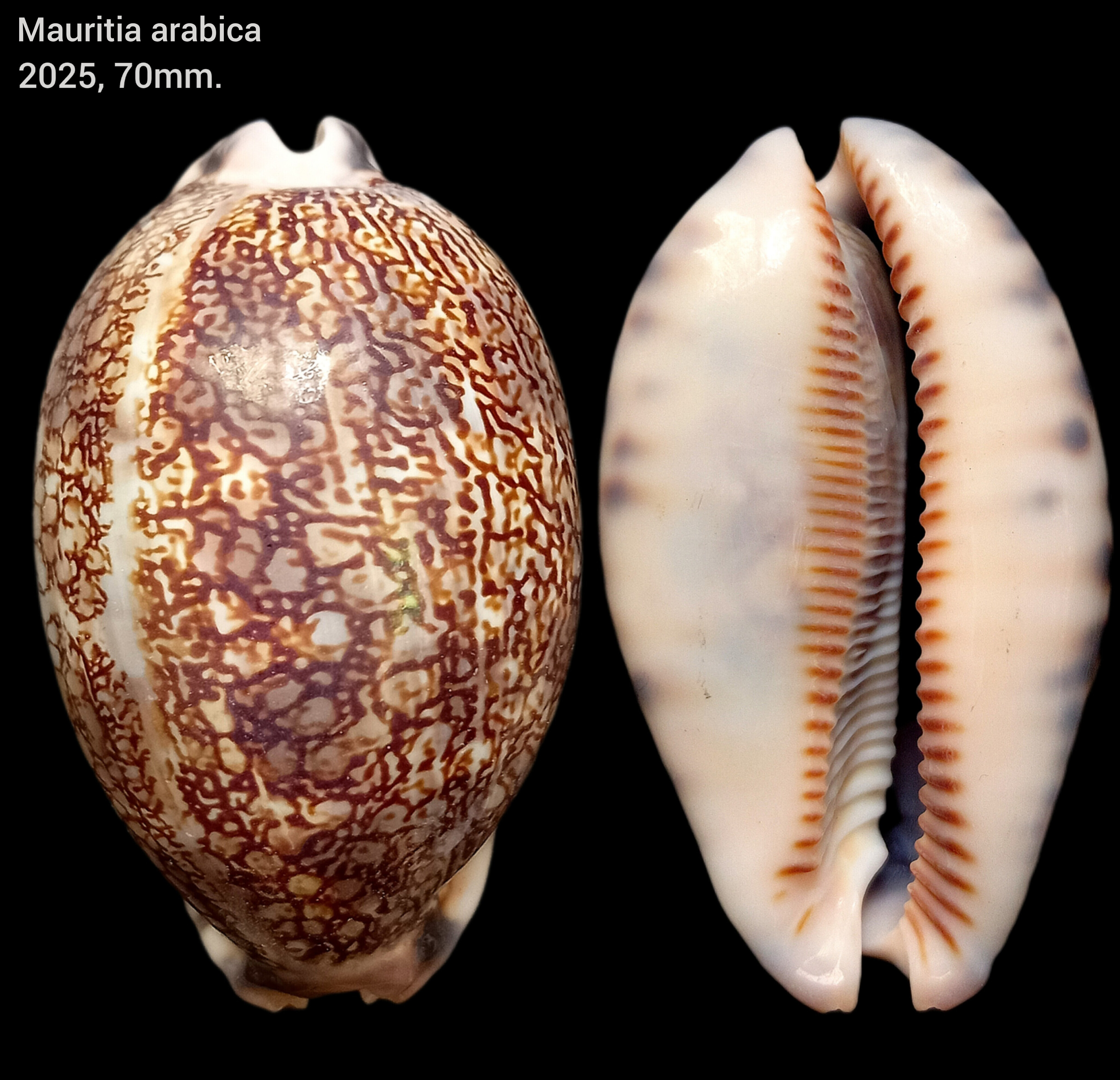
Mauritia arabica
