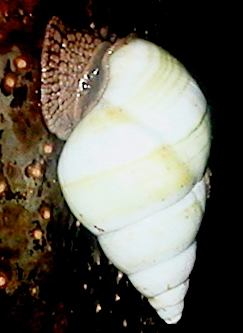
- A live individual of Liguus fasciatus on a tree

Scientific classification
- Kingdom: Animalia
- Phylum: Mollusca
- Class: Gastropoda
- Order: Stylommatophora
- Family: Orthalicidae
- Subfamily: Orthalicinae
- Genus: Liguus; Montfort, 1810

Type species
- Bulla virgineus Linnaeus, 1767

Diversity
- 5 species

= Liguus =

Genus of gastropods

Liguus is a genus of large tropical air-breathing land snails, more specifically arboreal or tree snails, terrestrial pulmonate gastropod mollusks in the family Orthalicidae.

These snails are especially notable for their relatively large size and for their often brightly colored shells, which sometimes have complex color patterning. Because of their visual appeal, the shells have been the target of heavy collection pressure, a serious issue since some varieties are very scarce, and some are believed to have become extinct in the 20th century.

== Distribution ==
The genus Liguus is restricted to some of the Greater Antilles (Cuba, Hispaniola) and to Florida. Four of the species, Liguus virgineus (Hispaniola), L. blainianus (Habana and Pinar del Río Provinces, Cuba), L. flammellus (Pinar del Río Province, Cuba), and L. vittatus (Oriente Province, Cuba [since 1976, divided into five new provinces]), have localized ranges, while the numerous subspecies of Liguus fasciatus are more widely distributed in both Cuba and southern Florida.

== Description ==
Liguus shares the distinguishing characteristics of other bulimulid gastropods in the subfamily Orthalicinae: large size (about 40 mm (1.6 in) in length), imperforate umbilicus, a jaw consisting of a limited number of broad plates, and the presence of a pineal gland. The shells of Liguus are more slender than those of Orthalicus, the only other orthalicine genus with which it is likely to be confused. The shape of Liguus shells is characterized by Pilsbry as "oblong-conic", versus "ovate-conic" for Orthalicus.

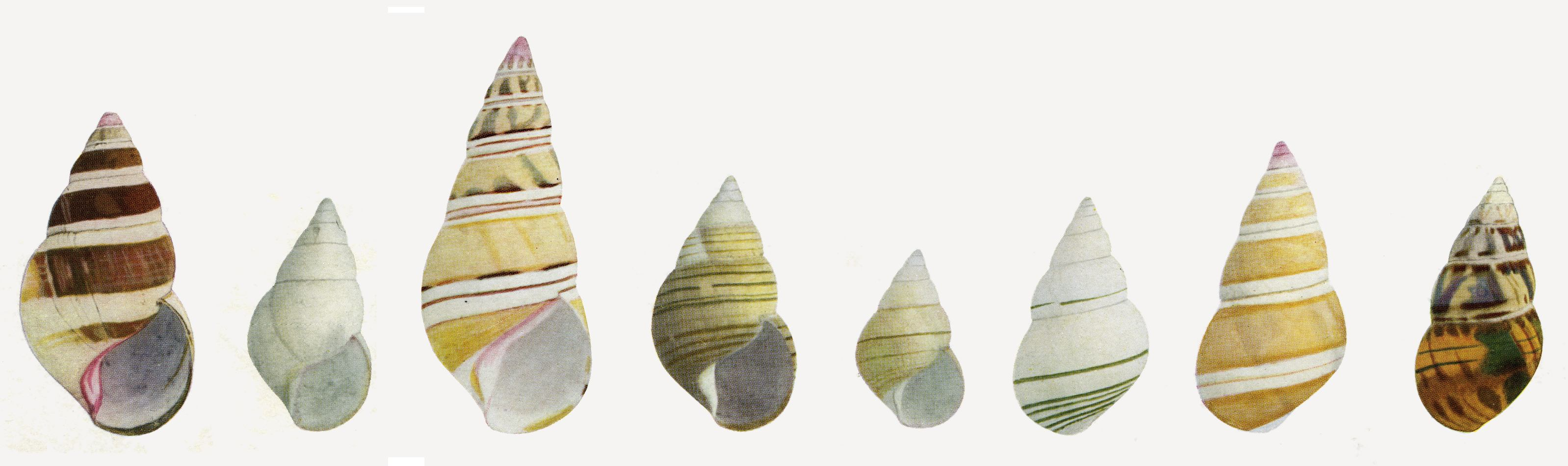
Generally recognized Florida subspecies of Liguus fasciatus (from Pilsbry, 1912), left to right: Liguus fasciatus castaneozonatus, L. f. elliottensis, L. f. graphicus, L. f. lossmanicus, L. f. matecumbensis, L. f. septentrionalis, L. f. solidus, and L. f. testudineus.

== Species ==
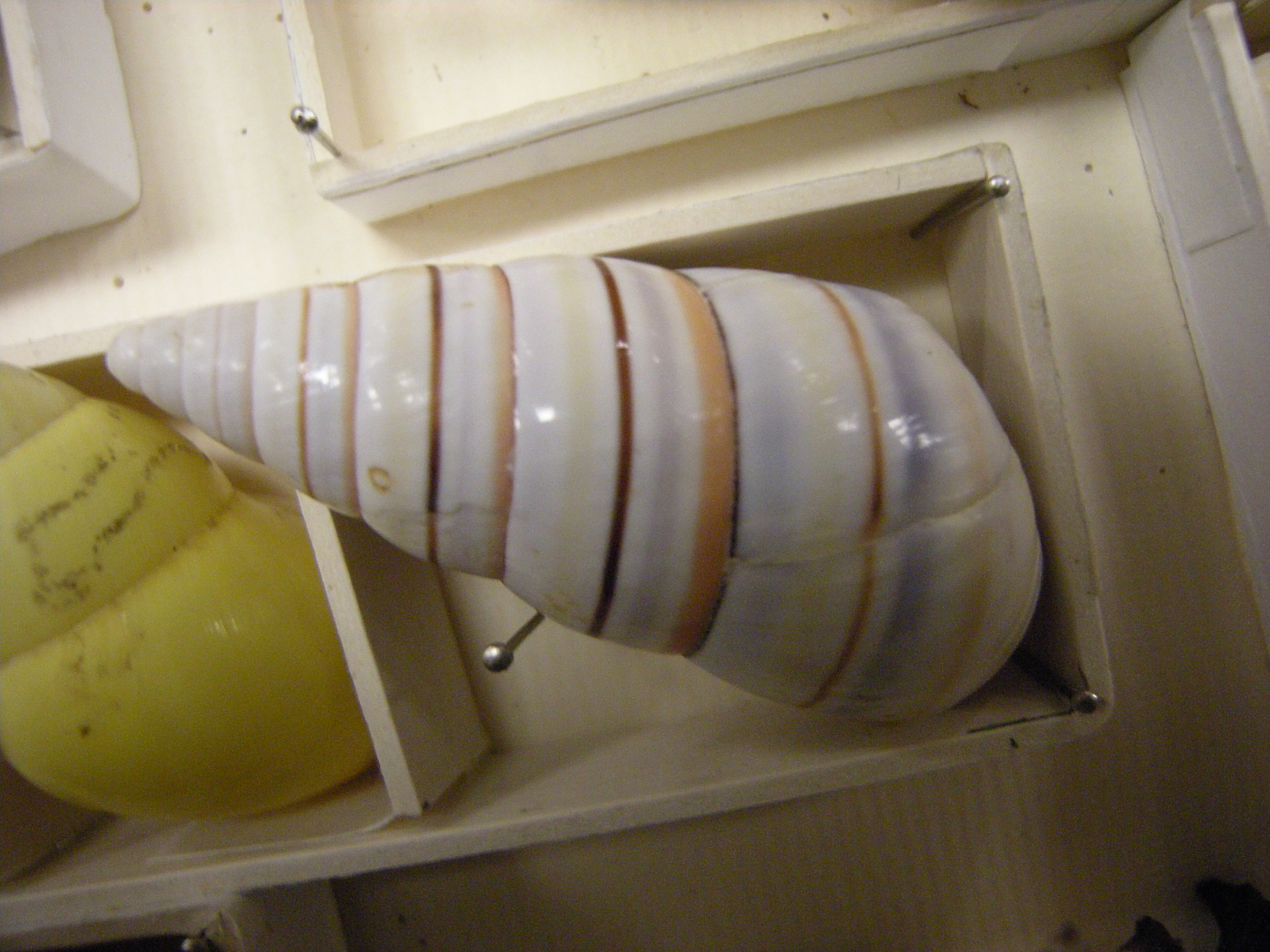
A shell of Liguus virgineus

Five species are now usually recognized in the genus Liguus:

- Liguus virgineus (Linnaeus, 1767) - type species of the genus Liguus
- Liguus blainianus (Poey, 1851)
- Liguus fasciatus (Müller, 1774)
- Liguus flammellus (Clench, 1934)
- Liguus vittatus (Swainson, 1822)

Many more species have been recognized in the past based on color varieties in the shell, but these taxa have largely been synonymized or placed as lesser level taxa under one or another of these five named species.

== Habitat ==
These snails are found on trees of many species, usually ones with smooth bark: false tamarind (Lysiloma latisiliquum), gumbo-limbo (Bursera simaruba), pigeonplum (Coccoloba diversifolia), black ironwood (Krugiodendron ferreum), false mastic (Sideroxylon foetidissimum), poisonwood (Metopium toxiferum), and Jamaica fishpoisontree (Piscidia piscipula), among others. In most cases, tropical forests suitable for Liguus have at least some surficial limestone, and limestone outcroppings are often present.
