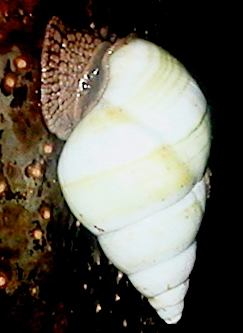

Conservation status
- Vulnerable (NatureServe)

Scientific classification
- Kingdom: Animalia
- Phylum: Mollusca
- Class: Gastropoda
- Order: Stylommatophora
- Family: Orthalicidae
- Genus: Liguus
- Species: L. fasciatus

Binomial name
- Liguus fasciatus (Müller, 1774)

= Liguus fasciatus =

Species of gastropod

Liguus fasciatus is a species of air-breathing land snail, a tree snail, a terrestrial pulmonate gastropod mollusk in the family Orthalicidae.

== Subspecies ==
In Florida this species includes the following 52 varieties or color forms, while in Cuba it is present in more than 70 varieties.

- Liguus fasciatus alternatus
- Liguus fasciatus aurantius
- Liguus fasciatus barbouri
- Liguus fasciatus capensis
- Liguus fasciatus goodrichi
- Liguus fasciatus castaneozonatus
- Liguus fasciatus castaneus
- Liguus fasciatus cingulatus
- Liguus fasciatus clenchi
- Liguus fasciatus crasus
- Liguus fasciatus deckerti
- Liguus fasciatus delicatus
- Liguus fasciatus dohertyi
- Liguus fasciatus dryas
- Liguus fasciatus eburneus
- Liguus fasciatus elegans
- Liguus fasciatus elliottensis
- Liguus fasciatus floridanus
- Liguus fasciatus fuscoflamellus
- Liguus fasciatus farnumi
- Liguus fasciatus gloryasylvaticus
- Liguus fasciatus graphicus
- Liguus fasciatus innominatus
- Liguus fasciatus lignumvitae
- Liguus fasciatus lineolatus
- Liguus fasciatus livingstoni
- Liguus fasciatus lossmanicus
- Liguus fasciatus lucidovarius
- Liguus fasciatus luteus
- Liguus fasciatus marmoratus
- Liguus fasciatus matecumbensis
- Liguus fasciatus miammiensis
- Liguus fasciatus mosieri
- Liguus fasciatus nebulosus
- Liguus fasciatus ornatus
- Liguus fasciatus osmenti
- Liguus fasciatus pictus
- Liguus fasciatus pseudopictus
- Liguus fasciatus roseatus
- Liguus fasciatus septentrionalis
- Liguus fasciatus simpsoni
- Liguus fasciatus solidulus
- Liguus fasciatus solicoccasus
- Liguus fasciatus splendidus
- Liguus fasciatus subcrenatus
- Liguus fasciatus testudineus
- Liguus fasciatus vacaensis
- Liguus fasciatus versicolor
- Liguus fasciatus violafumosus
- Liguus fasciatus walkeri
- Liguus fasciatus wintei
- Liguus fasciatus solidus
- Liguus fasciatus vonpaulseni

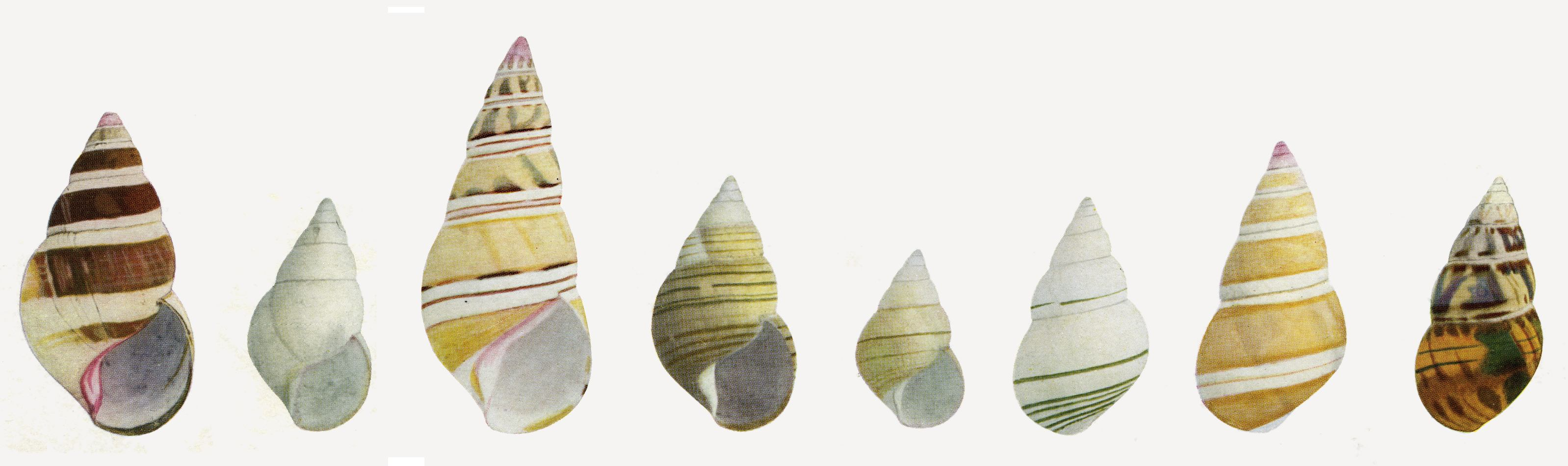
The shells of subspecies of Liguus fasciatus (from Pilsbry, 1912), left to right: Liguus fasciatus castaneozonatus, L. f. elliottensis, L. f. graphicus, L. f. lossmanicus, L. f. matecumbensis, L. f. septentrionalis, L. f. solidus, and L. f. testudineus.

== Description ==
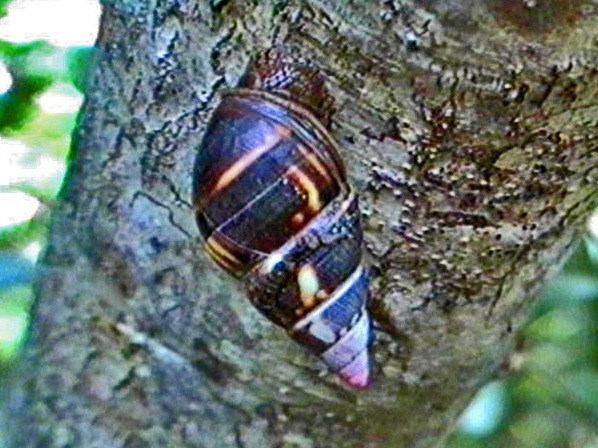
A live individual of Liguus fasciatus from Everglades

Shells of Liguus fasciatus can reach a size of 42–68 millimetres (1.7–2.7 in). These polished shining shells, ranging from white to almost black, have whorls banded with many colors (chestnut, orange, yellow pink or green).

These tree snails feed on fungus and algae scraped from the bark of the host plants (mainly wild tamarind (Lysiloma latisiliquum), pigeon plum (Coccoloba diversifolia) and Myrsine species). They can be found mainly from May through September, but they are active throughout the year.

== Distribution ==
This species is the most widespread of all the Liguus. It occurs in the Caribbean bioregion, in South Florida, the Florida Keys, Cuba, and Isla de la Juventud).

== Habitat ==
These tree snails can be found in southern Florida on hammocks, tropical forest and shrubs habitats that are slightly higher in elevation than the surrounding area.

== Gallery ==
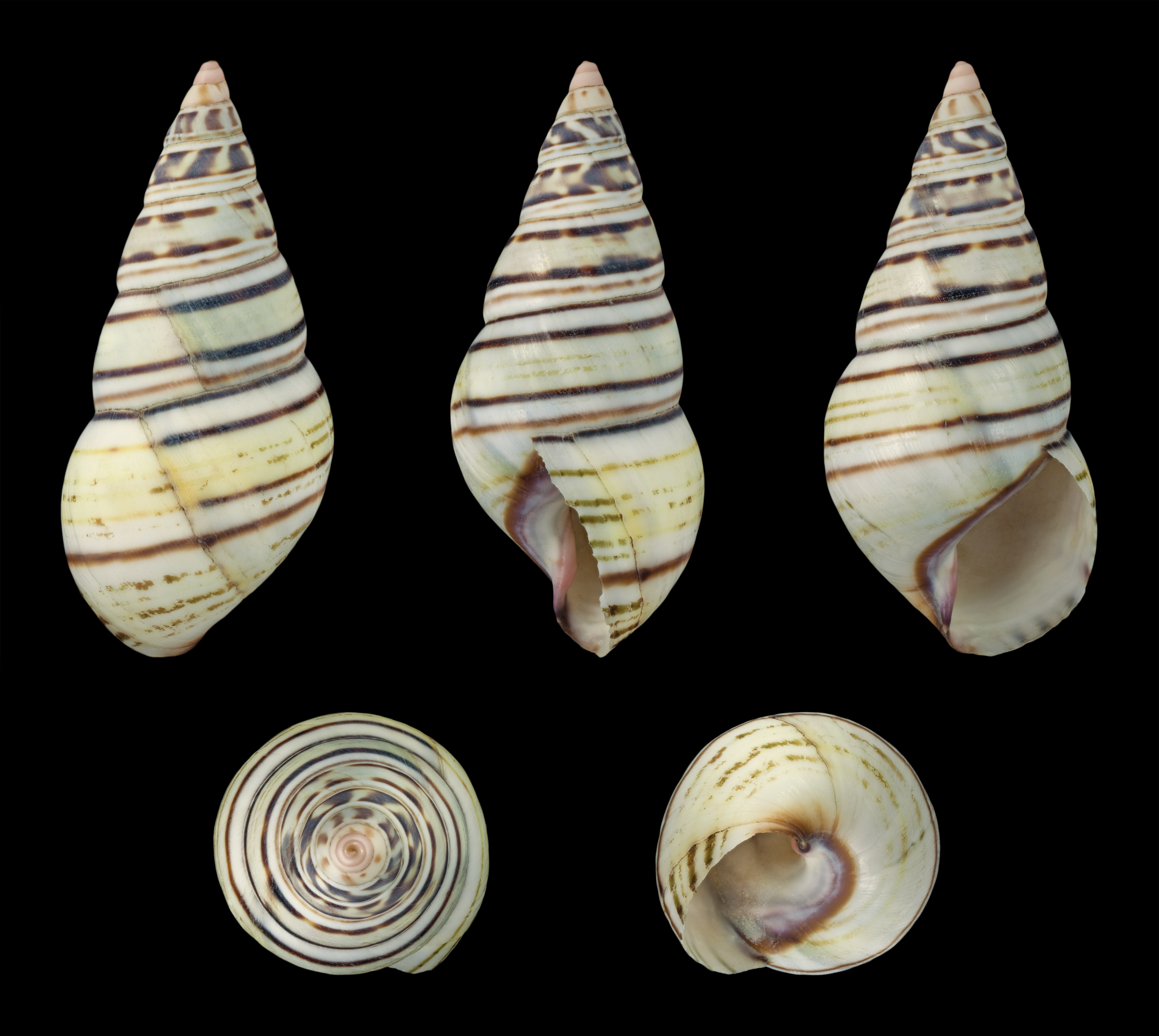
Liguus fasciatus achatinus

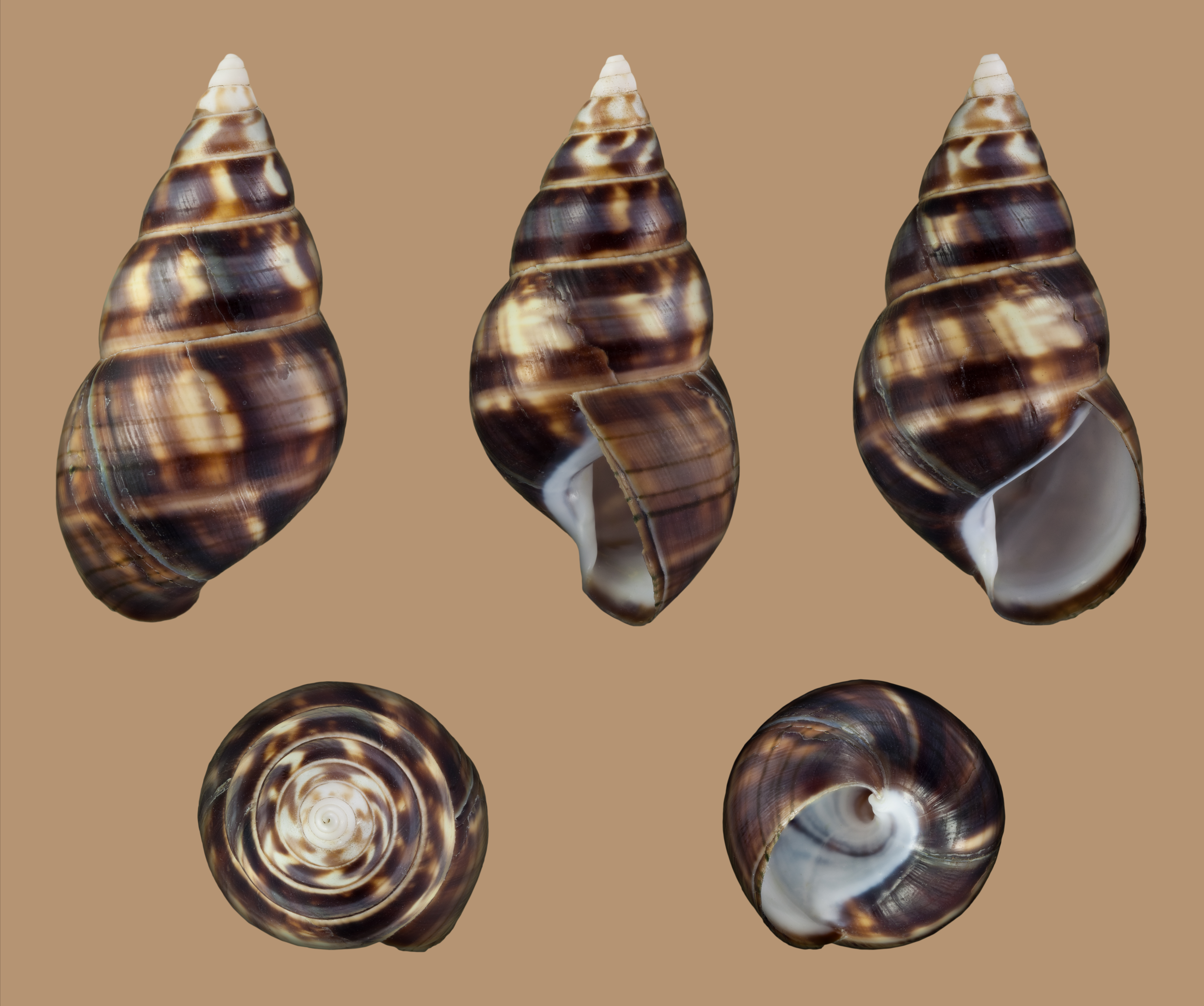
Liguus fasciatus testudineus

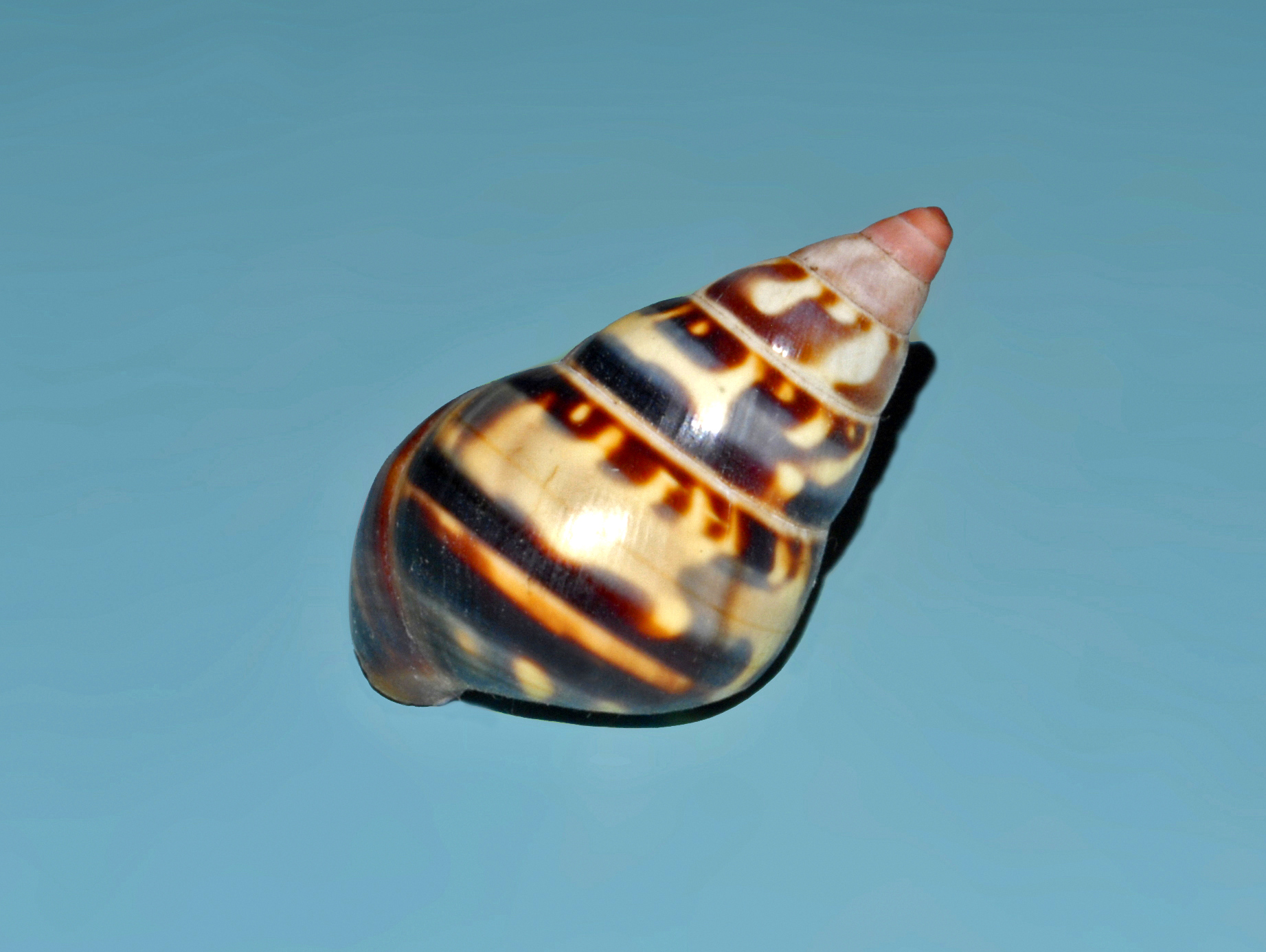
Shell of Liguus fasciatus from Everglades

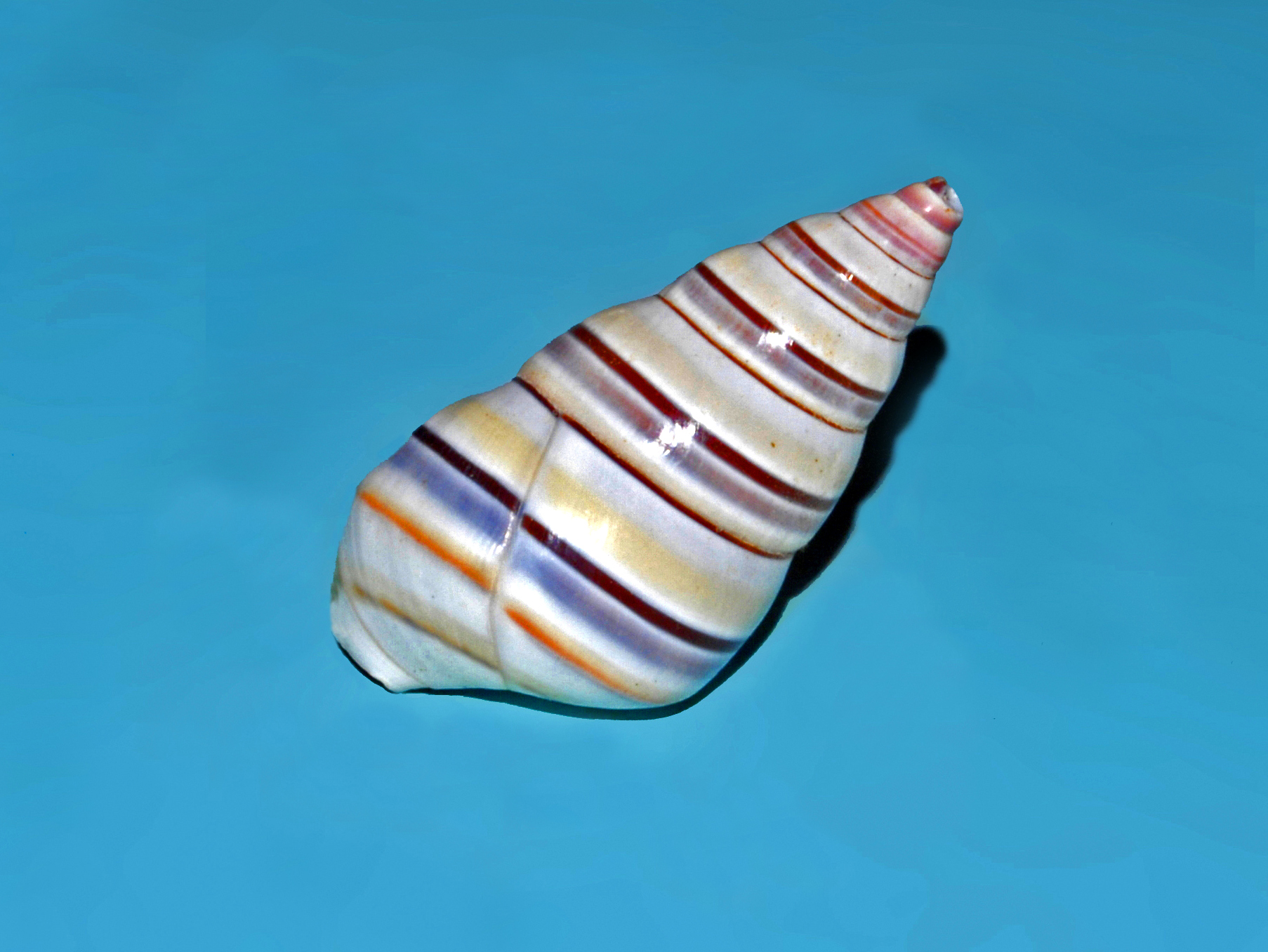

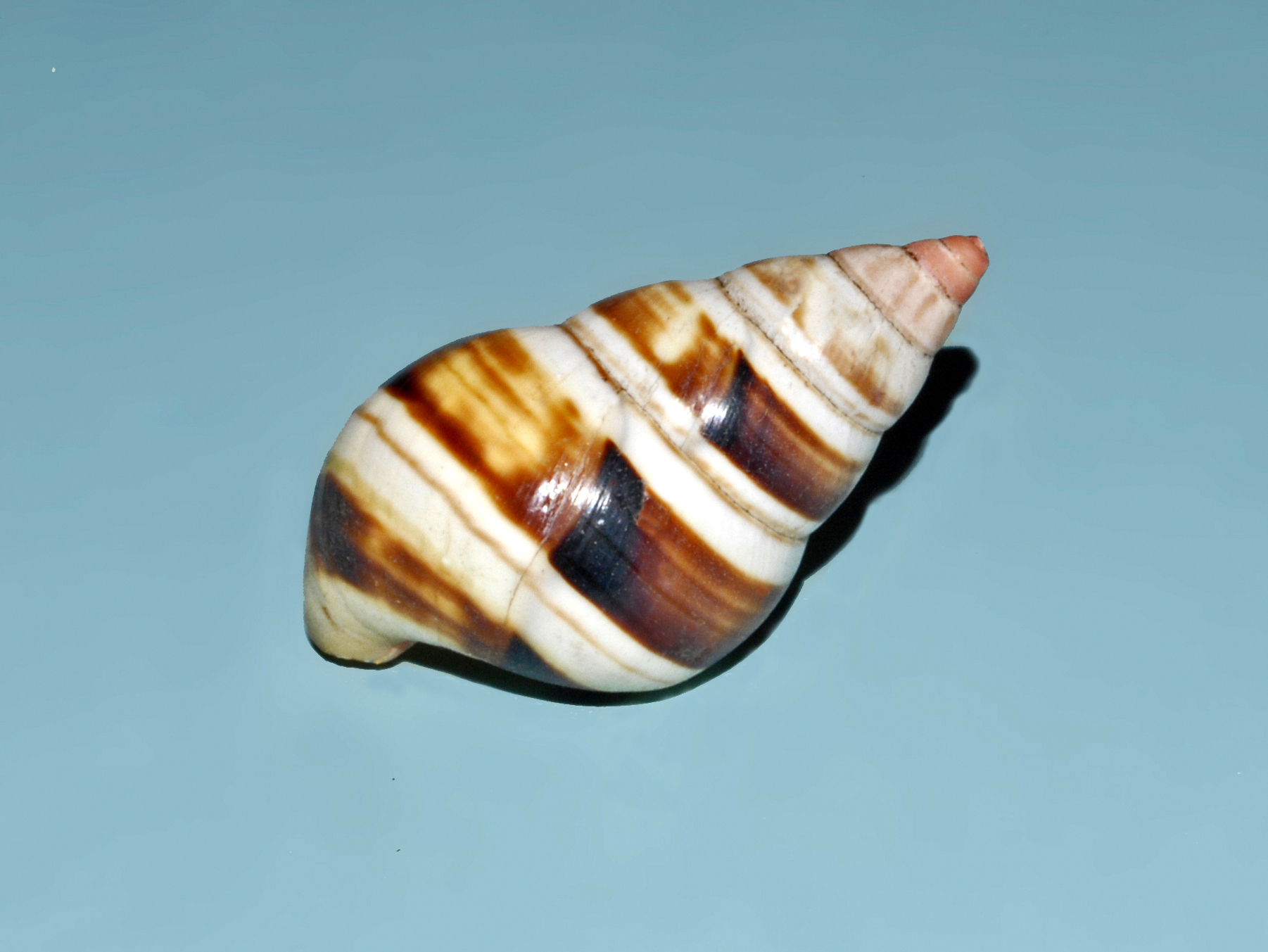

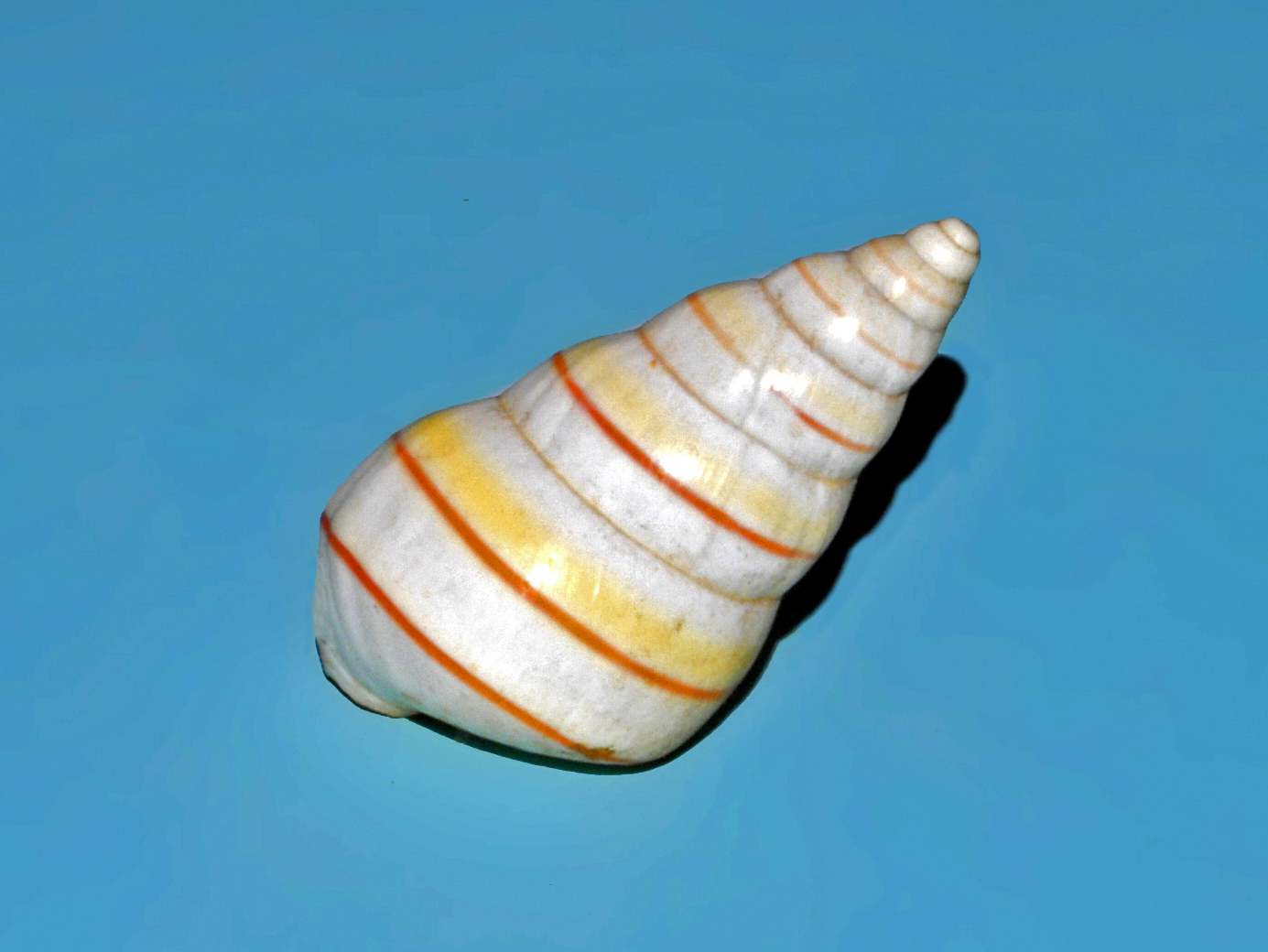

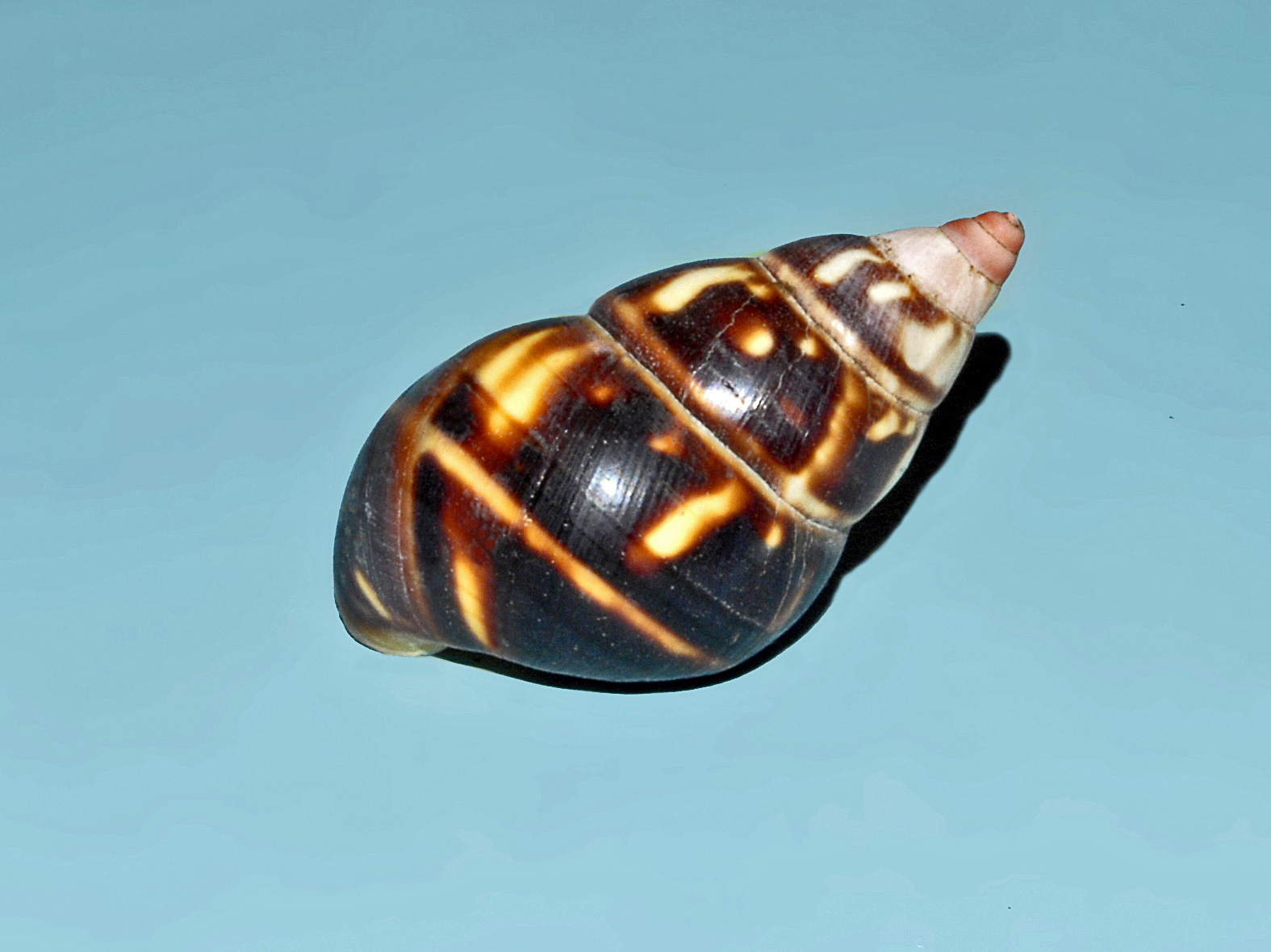
