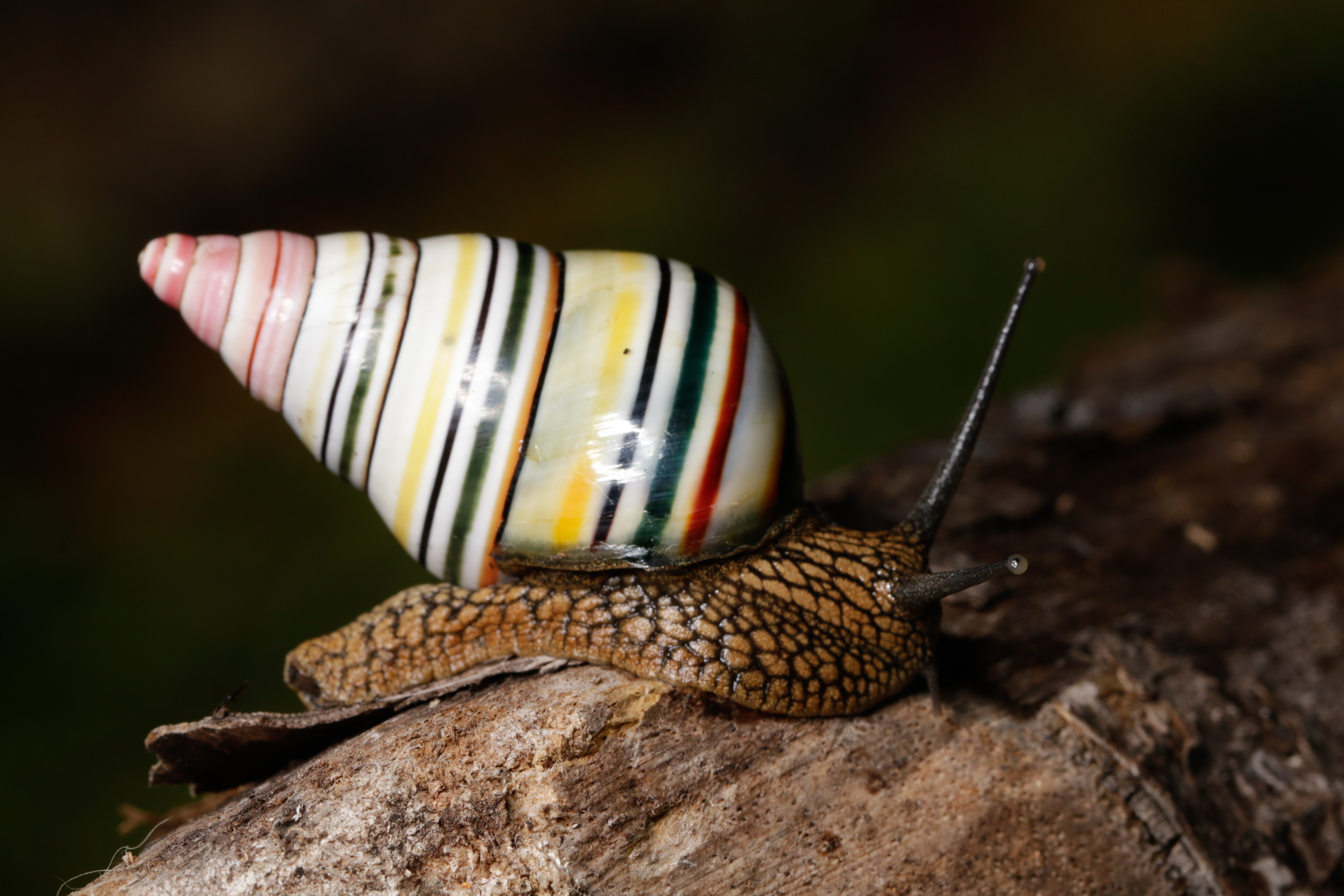

Scientific classification
- Kingdom: Animalia
- Phylum: Mollusca
- Class: Gastropoda
- Order: Stylommatophora
- Family: Orthalicidae
- Genus: Liguus
- Species: L. virgineus

Binomial name
- Liguus virgineus (Linnaeus, 1758)

Synonyms
- Bulla virginea Linnaeus, 1758; Achatina virginea Linnaeus, 1758

= Liguus virgineus =

Species of gastropod

Liguus virgineus, also known as the candy cane snail, is a species of tree-living snail native to the Caribbean island of Hispaniola. It has a distinctive conical shell of 30–60 mm (1.2–2.4 in). The background of the shell is white; there are typically 3–6 spiraling stripes of various colors, including brown, black, pink, green, purple, or light yellow. The shells are typically right-handed with seven or eight whorls. Though it spends most of its life in trees, it descends to lay its eggs in moist soil. It consumes various kinds of lichens throughout its life, as well as twigs and small branches. Its shells have been discovered in midden heaps in the Dominican Republic, indicating that it was a food resource for indigenous peoples. Early European explorers to Hispaniola brought the shells back to Europe, and it has been depicted in scientific illustrations since 1684, making it first Neotropical land snail that was scientifically illustrated.

== Description ==
Shells of Liguus virgineus can reach a length of 30–60 millimetres (1.2–2.4 in). These small shells are oval-conical shaped, thin but robust. The shell surface is smooth and shiny. The aperture (opening of the shell) is semicircular. The shell has seven or eight whorls; the tip of the shell is obtuse, or not sharply pointed. Like most gastropods, individuals typically have dextral (right-handed) shells, though sinistral (left-handed) shells have been documented. Its slime and epiphragms (temporary structures that prevent water loss) are both green.

The appearance of the shell is striking and has been compared to painted porcelain. The background color of the shell is white or creamy-white, with thin bright spiral stripes. The stripes can be brown, black, pink, green, purple, or light yellow. A single shell can have stripes of a single color or as many as three different colors. There are typically 3–6 stripes. The aperture may be dark-grey or white-purple with scarlet lips. The reasons for the wide variety of color patterns seen in this species are not understood.

The stripes of its shell have high contrast relative to the background in both the visible light spectrum and the near-ultraviolet spectrum (340-400 nm). There is very little contrast in the near-infrared spectrum (700-1000 nm).

Its tongue membrane is long and broad with about two hundred rows of teeth. Its jaw is slightly arched and is composed of fourteen different plates.

== Biology and ecology ==
Snails of the genus Liguus spend most of their lives in trees, though they do descend to lay eggs on moist ground. Upon hatching, the young snails climb a tree. Adults' diets consist primarily of bark-growing lichens. Newly hatched young will feed on leaf-growing lichen, progressing to twigs and small branches, then finally the bark-growing lichens.

Like other snails, its shell coloration is produced by pigment glands in the mantle, called chromophores. These chromophores are active for the entire life of individuals, resulting in the continuous colored lines of the shell.

== Range and habitat ==
This species is endemic to the Caribbean island of Hispaniola (in Haiti and the Dominican Republic). It is arboreal (lives in trees) and has been found on the branches of the tree Haematoxylum campechianum.

== Historic use and depictions ==
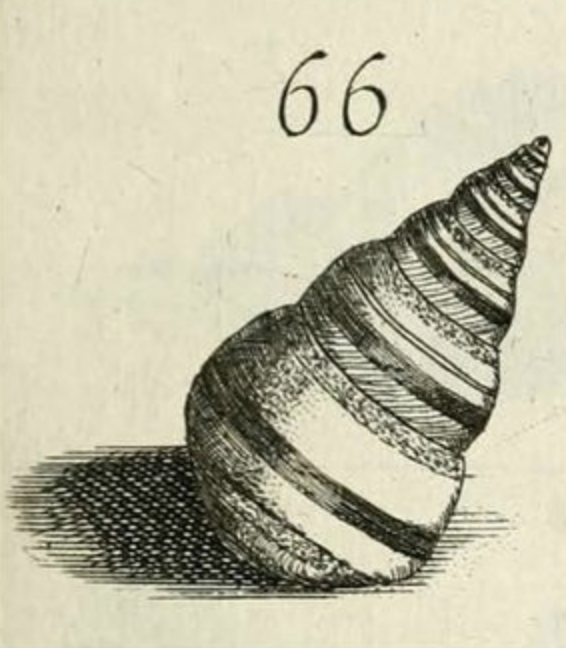
Illustration of L. virgineus from Filippo Bonanni's Recreatio Mentis et Oculi (1684)

Shells of L. virgineus have been discovered in midden heaps in the Dominican Republic, indicating its use by indigenous peoples. The presence of shells from L. virgineus and two other terrestrial gastropods showed that shellfish were gathered from both rivers and the countryside.

As the island of Hispaniola was one of the earliest sites of European contact, the brightly colored and distinctive shells of L. virgineus have been represented in scientific illustrations for hundreds of years. The first illustration attributed to L. virgineus was published in 1684 in Filippo Bonanni's Recreatio Mentis et Oculi. Thus, it was the first scientific illustration of any neotropical land snail.
