= Liguus vittatus =

- Liguus vittatus

Scientific classification
- Kingdom: Animalia
- Phylum: Mollusca
- Class: Gastropoda
- Order: Stylommatophora
- Family: Orthalicidae
- Genus: Liguus
- Species: L. vittatus

Binomial name
- Liguus vittatus (Swainson, 1822)

Synonyms
- Achatina vittata Swainson, 1822; Achatina poeyana Pfeiffer, 1857; Liguus poeyanus (Pfeiffer, 1857); Liguus vittatus porphyreus Jaume, 1952; Liguus vittatus thapsinus Jaume, 1952; Liguus vittatus vittatus (Swainson, 1822)

Species of gastropod

Liguus vittatus, commonly known as the ribbon liguus, is a species of land snail in the family Orthalicidae. It is native to the former Oriente Province of eastern Cuba.
