= Aversion =

Aversion means opposition or repugnance. The following are different forms of aversion:

- Ambiguity aversion
- Brand aversion
- Dissent aversion in the United States of America
- Endowment effect, also known as divestiture aversion
- Food aversion (disambiguation)
- Inequity aversion
- Loss aversion
- Risk aversion
- Sexual aversion
- Taste aversion (disambiguation)
- Work aversion

Aversion may also refer to:

- Aversion therapy
- Aversion (film)
- Dvesha, a Buddhist term that translates to aversion

== See also ==
- Repulsion (disambiguation)
