= Available space theory =

Theory explaining plant leaf patterns

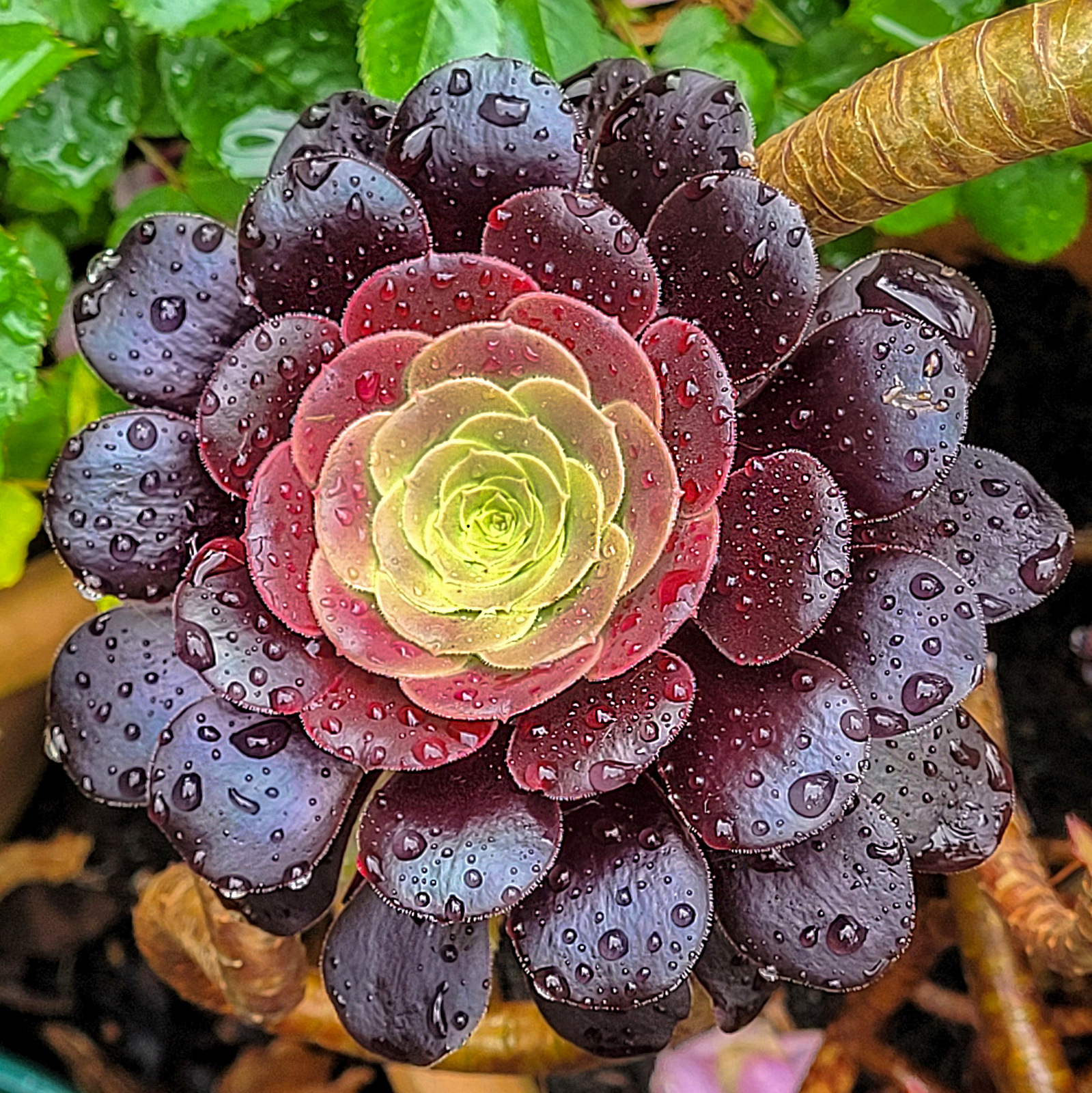
Succulent rosettes like this Aeonium arboreum clearly show how leaves arrange themselves according to available space theory—each new leaf emerges in the largest gap between existing leaves, creating an efficient spiral that maximizes sun exposure for photosynthesis.

In botany, available space theory (also known as first available space theory) explains why leaves on most plant stems are arranged in predictable spiral patterns rather than randomly scattered. The theory states that the location of a new leaf on a stem is determined by the physical space between existing leaves. In other words, the location of a new leaf on a growing stem is directly related to the amount of space between the previous two leaves.

== Development and evaluation ==
The classical available space theory can be traced to Wilhelm Hofmeister, who in his 1868 work Allgemeine Morphologie der Gewache proposed that each new baby leaf (primordium) appears in the largest available space at the growing tip of the plant and then drifts outward as the stem extends. His three empirical rules stressed periodic initiation in the least-crowded zone, radial displacement after initiation, and a gradual slowing of that displacement as the shoot enlarges. Although elementary by modern standards, these observations established a simple geometric framework for later workers.

Mary and Robert Snow revived the idea in a series of surgical experiments on Lupinus in 1931. They assumed primordia are equal in size and showed that several can arise simultaneously, providing a straightforward explanation for true whorls; once a few primordia are established the pattern stabilises into a regular phyllotactic fraction. Their work shifted the emphasis from static description to experimentally testable rules about where the "first available space" actually is on a living apex.

Subsequent researchers have treated the theory as a packing problem. Simon Schwendener (1878) imagined young primordia as elastic spheres that naturally settle into hexagonal close packing, with small positional shifts giving rise to new spiral families (parastichies, the visible spiral lines you can trace through leaf positions) as the dome grows. Gerrit van Iterson (1907) formalised this with a single variable—the ratio of primordium diameter to stem circumference—showing that as the stem gets wider compared to the leaf buds, you naturally get the famous Fibonacci spiral patterns found throughout nature. Scientists even tested this with a computer model that 'dropped' virtual coins onto a cylinder, and the coins naturally arranged themselves into the same spiral patterns seen in real plants.

However, modern scientists think this theory is too simple. It describes what we see but does not explain how plant cells actually coordinate to create such precise patterns, often accurate to within fractions of a degree. Robert Korn's 2008 comparative review argues that any convincing model must also reproduce the small natural variance in successive angles and cope with patterns (for example, the false whorls of Peperomia) that violate the simple largest-gap rule. Consequently, modern phyllotaxis research often treats available space effects as a secondary constraint acting alongside auxin transport gradients or vascular induction, rather than as a stand-alone explanation.

== See also ==
- Repulsion theory
