= Hunger (physiology) =

Sensation experienced when one feels the physiological need to eat food

Hunger is a sensation that motivates the consumption of food. The sensation of hunger typically manifests after only a few hours without eating and is generally considered to be unpleasant. Satiety occurs between 5 and 20 minutes after eating. There are several theories about how the feeling of hunger arises. The desire to eat food, or appetite, is another sensation experienced with regard to eating.

The term hunger is also the most commonly used in social science and policy discussions to describe the condition of people who suffer from a chronic lack of sufficient food and constantly or frequently experience the sensation of hunger, and can lead to malnutrition. A healthy, well-nourished individual can survive for weeks without food intake (see fasting), with claims ranging from three to ten weeks.

Satiety is the opposite of hunger; it is the sensation of feeling full.

== Hunger pangs ==
The physical sensation of hunger is related to the contractions of the muscles of the empty stomach. Peristalsis takes place even when the stomach is empty, and these contractions—sometimes called hunger pangs once they become severe—are believed to be triggered by high concentrations of the ghrelin hormone. The migrating motor complex is a pattern of hunger contractions that takes place in the hungry stomach and gut; they are correlated in time with subjective sensations of hunger and are even responsible for the rumbling associated with a hungry stomach. In contrast, the hormones peptide YY and leptin can have an opposite effect on the appetite, causing the sensation of being full. Ghrelin can be released if blood sugar levels dip too low—a condition called hypoglycemia that can result from long periods without eating. Stomach contractions from hunger can be especially severe and painful in children and young adults.

Hunger pangs can be made worse by irregular meals. People who cannot afford to eat more than once a day sometimes refuse one-off additional meals, because if they do not eat at around the same time on the next days, they may suffer extra severe hunger pangs. Older people may feel less violent stomach contractions when they get hungry, but still suffer the secondary effects resulting from low food intake: these include weakness, irritability and decreased concentration. Prolonged lack of adequate nutrition also causes increased susceptibility to disease and reduced ability for the body to heal.

== Short-term regulation of hunger and food intake ==
Short-term regulation of hunger and food intake involves neural signals from the GI tract, blood levels of nutrients, GI tract hormones, and psychological factors.

=== Neural signals from the GI tract ===
One method that the brain uses to evaluate the contents of the gut is through vagal nerve fibers that carry signals between the brain and the gastrointestinal tract (GI tract). Stretch receptors work to inhibit appetite upon distention of the GI tract by sending signals along the vagus nerve afferent pathway and inhibiting the hunger center.

=== Hormone signals ===
The hormones insulin and cholecystokinin (CCK) are released from the GI tract during food absorption and act to suppress the feeling of hunger. CCK is key in suppressing hunger because of its role in inhibiting neuropeptide Y. Glucagon and epinephrine levels rise during fasting and stimulate hunger. Ghrelin, a hormone produced by the stomach, is an appetite stimulant.

=== Psychological factors ===
Two psychological processes appear to be involved in regulating short-term food intake: liking and wanting. Liking refers to the palatability or taste of the food, which is reduced by repeated consumption. Wanting is the motivation to consume the food, which is also reduced by repeated consumption of a food and may be due to change in memory-related processes. Wanting can be triggered by a variety of psychological processes. Thoughts of a food may intrude on consciousness and be elaborated on, for instance, as when one sees a commercial or smells a desirable food.

== Long-term regulation of hunger and food intake ==
The regulation of appetite (the appestat) has been the subject of much research; breakthroughs included the discovery, in 1994, of leptin, a hormone produced by the adipose tissue that appeared to provide negative feedback. Leptin is a peptide hormone that affects homeostasis and immune responses. Lowering food intake can lower leptin levels in the body, while increasing the intake of food can raise leptin levels. Later studies showed that appetite regulation is an immensely complex process involving the gastrointestinal tract, many hormones, and both the central and autonomic nervous systems. The circulating gut hormones that regulate many pathways in the body can either stimulate or suppress appetite. For example, ghrelin stimulates appetite, whereas cholecystokinin and glucagon-like peptide-1 (GLP-1) suppress appetite.

=== Effector ===
The arcuate nucleus of the hypothalamus, a part of the brain, is the main regulatory organ for the human appetite. Many brain neurotransmitters affect appetite, especially dopamine and serotonin. Dopamine acts primarily through the reward centers of the brain, whereas serotonin primarily acts through effects on neuropeptide Y (NPY)/agouti-related peptide (AgRP) [stimulate appetite] and proopiomelanocortin (POMC) [induce satiety] neurons located in the arcuate nucleus. Similarly, the hormones leptin and insulin suppress appetite through effects on AgRP and POMC neurons.

Hypothalamocortical and hypothalamolimbic projections contribute to the awareness of hunger, and the somatic processes controlled by the hypothalamus include vagal tone (the activity of the parasympathetic autonomic nervous system), stimulation of the thyroid (thyroxine regulates the metabolic rate), the hypothalamic-pituitary-adrenal axis and a large number of other mechanisms. Opioid receptor-related processes in the nucleus accumbens and ventral pallidum affect the palatability of foods.

The nucleus accumbens (NAc) is the area of the brain that coordinates neurotransmitter, opioid and endocannabinoid signals to control feeding behaviour. The few important signalling molecules inside the NAc shell modulate the motivation to eat and the affective reactions for food. These molecules include the dopamine (DA), acetylcholine (Ach), opioids and cannabinoids and their action receptors inside the brain, DA, muscarinic and μ-opioid receptor (MOR) and CB1 receptors respectively.

=== Sensor ===
The hypothalamus senses external stimuli mainly through a number of hormones such as leptin, ghrelin, PYY 3-36, orexin and cholecystokinin; all modify the hypothalamic response. They are produced by the digestive tract and by adipose tissue (leptin). Systemic mediators, such as tumor necrosis factor-alpha (TNFα), interleukins 1 and 6 and corticotropin-releasing hormone (CRH) influence appetite negatively; this mechanism explains why ill people often eat less.

Leptin, a hormone secreted exclusively by adipose cells in response to an increase in body fat mass, is an important component in the regulation of long term hunger and food intake. Leptin serves as the brain's indicator of the body's total energy stores. When leptin levels rise in the bloodstream they bind to receptors in ARC. The functions of leptin are to:

- Suppress the release of neuropeptide Y (NPY), which in turn prevents the release of appetite enhancing orexins from the lateral hypothalamus. This decreases appetite and food intake, promoting weight loss.
- Stimulate the expression of cocaine and amphetamine regulated transcript (CART).

Though rising blood levels of leptin do promote weight loss to some extent, its main role is to protect the body against weight loss in times of nutritional deprivation. Other factors also have been shown to effect long-term hunger and food intake regulation including insulin.

In addition, the biological clock (which is regulated by the hypothalamus) stimulates hunger. Processes from other cerebral loci, such as from the limbic system and the cerebral cortex, project on the hypothalamus and modify appetite. This explains why in clinical depression and stress, energy intake can change quite drastically.

=== Set point theories of hunger and eating ===
The set point theories of hunger and eating are a group of theories developed in the 1940s and 1950s that operate under the assumption that hunger is the result of an energy deficit and that eating is a means by which energy resources are returned to their optimal level, or energy set point. According to this assumption, a person's energy resources are thought to be at or near their set point soon after eating, and are thought to decline after that. Once the person's energy levels fall below a certain threshold, the sensation of hunger is experienced, which is the body's way of motivating the person to eat again. The set point assumption is a negative feedback mechanism. Two popular set point theories include the glucostatic set point theory and the lipostatic set point theory.

The set point theories of hunger and eating present a number of weaknesses.

- The current epidemic of obesity and eating disorders undermines these theories.
- The set point theories of hunger and eating are inconsistent with basic evolutionary pressures related to hunger and eating as they are currently understood.
- Major predictions of the set point theories of hunger and eating have not been confirmed.
- They fail to recognize other psychological and social influences on hunger and eating.

== Positive-incentive perspective ==
The positive-incentive perspective is an umbrella term for a set of theories presented as an alternative to the set-point theories of hunger and eating. The central assertion to the positive-incentive perspective is the idea that humans and other animals are not normally motivated to eat by energy deficits, but are instead motivated to eat by the anticipated pleasure of eating, or the positive-incentive value. According to this perspective, eating is controlled in much the same way as sexual behavior. Humans engage in sexual behavior, not because of an internal deficit, but instead because they have evolved to crave it. Similarly, the evolutionary pressures of unexpected food shortages have shaped humans and all other warm blooded animals to take advantage of food when it is present. It is the presence of good food, or the mere anticipation of it that makes one hungry.

== Premeal hunger ==
Prior to consuming a meal, the body's energy reserves are in reasonable homeostatic balance. However, when a meal is consumed, there is a homeostasis-disturbing influx of fuels into the bloodstream. When the usual mealtime approaches, the body takes steps to soften the impact of the homeostasis-disturbing influx of fuels by releasing insulin into the blood, and lowering the blood glucose levels. It is this lowering of blood glucose levels that causes premeal hunger, and not necessarily an energy deficit.

== Similar conditions ==
A food craving is an intense desire to consume a specific food, as opposed to general hunger. Similarly, thirst is the craving for water.

A concept of food noise or food chatter has gotten more attention in the early 2020s since the advent of antiobesity indications for a class of medications called GLP-1 agonists (e.g., semaglutide). Food noise is a mental preoccupation with food in general (as opposed to one specific food) that is largely independent from physiological hunger but nonetheless is distracting for many people; it includes recurring thoughts about what one has or hasn't eaten in recent hours, what one would like to eat right now or "shouldn't" eat right now, and what one might be eating (or "should" avoid eating) in upcoming hours. Among people for whom these medications are effective in helping with weight loss, most express that the level of food noise in their mind is noticeably reduced. Even without these medications, some people may be able to reduce food noise by modifying their dietary patterns and exercise; this is more effective for some people than others.

An expert panel convened in 2024 defined food noise as "Persistent thoughts about food that are perceived by the individual as being unwanted and/or dysphoric and may cause harm to the individual, including social, mental, or physical problems." The group also developed and conducted a rigorous, multi-step evaluation of an instrument to measure food noise (Ro-Allison-Indiana-Dhurandhar Food Noise Instrument, or RAID-FN).

== See also ==
- Anorectic
- Eating disorder
- Fasting
- Food aversion (disambiguation)
- Ghrelin
- Gluttony
- Hunger strike
- Hypoglycemia
- Polyphagia
- Postprandial somnolence
- Satiety value
- Specific appetite
- Starvation
- Stomach rumble
- Taste aversion (disambiguation)
- Thirst
- Famine
- Prader–Willi syndrome
