= Golden angle =

Angle created by applying the golden ratio to a circle

The golden angle is the angle subtended by the smaller (red) arc when two arcs that make up a circle are in the golden ratio

In geometry, the golden angle is the smaller of the two angles created by sectioning the circumference of a circle according to the golden ratio; that is, into two arcs such that the ratio of the length of the smaller arc to the length of the larger arc is the same as the ratio of the length of the larger arc to the full circumference of the circle.

Algebraically, let a+b be the circumference of a circle, divided into a longer arc of length a and a smaller arc of length b such that

$$\frac{a + b}{a} = \frac{a}{b}$$

The golden angle is then the angle subtended by the smaller arc of length b. It measures approximately 137.5077640500378546463487...° (OEIS: A096627) or 2.39996322972865332... radians (OEIS: A131988).

The name comes from the golden angle's connection to the golden ratio φ; the exact value of the golden angle is

$$360\left(1 - \frac{1}{\varphi}\right) = 360(2 - \varphi) = \frac{360}{\varphi^2} = 180(3 - \sqrt{5})\text{ degrees}$$

or

$$2\pi \left( 1 - \frac{1}{\varphi}\right) = 2\pi(2 - \varphi) = \frac{2\pi}{\varphi^2} = \pi(3 - \sqrt{5})\text{ radians},$$

where the equivalences follow from well-known algebraic properties of the golden ratio.

== Derivation ==
Multiplying the defining equation for the golden ratio
$$\varphi^2 = \varphi + 1$$
by $1/\varphi^2$ gives
$$1 = \frac{1}{\varphi} + \frac{1}{\varphi^2}.$$
When two angles that sum to $360^\circ$ have a ratio of $\varphi$, the larger one has size $360^\circ/\varphi \approx 222.5^\circ \approx 3.883 ~\text{radians}$ and the smaller one has size $360^\circ/\varphi^2 \approx 137.5^\circ \approx 2.400 ~\text{radians}$. In particular, the fraction of a circle occupied by the golden angle is
$$f = \frac{1}{\varphi^2} \approx 0.381966\,.$$

== Golden angle in nature ==
The angle between successive florets in some flowers is the golden angle.

Animation simulating the spawning of sunflower seeds from a central meristem where the next seed is oriented one golden angle away from the previous seed.

The golden angle plays a significant role in the theory of phyllotaxis; for example, the golden angle is the angle separating the florets on a sunflower. Analysis of the pattern shows that it is highly sensitive to the angle separating the individual primordia, with the Fibonacci angle giving the parastichy with optimal packing density.

Mathematical modelling of a plausible physical mechanism for floret development has shown the pattern arising spontaneously from the solution of a nonlinear partial differential equation on a plane.

== Straightedge and compass construction ==
As its sine and cosine are transcendental numbers, the golden angle cannot be constructed using a straightedge and compass. Artist Almada Negreiros discovered an approximate construction that is accurate to 0.11°.

== See also ==
- 137 (number)
- 138 (number)
- Golden ratio
- Fibonacci sequence
