= Repulsion =

Repulsion may refer to:

- Disgust, or repulsion, an emotional response to something considered offensive or unpleasant
- Repulsion, a type of genetic linkage
- Repulsion in physics, Coulomb's law
  - Repulsion in diamagnetism, which pushes two bodies away from each other
- Repulsion theory, in botany

In the arts:

- Repulsion (band), a grindcore band
- Repulsion (film), a 1965 horror film directed by Roman Polański
- "Repulsion", a 1985 song by Dinosaur Jr

== See also ==
- Aversion (disambiguation)
- Repulse (disambiguation)
- Repulsive force (disambiguation)
