= Repulse =

Repulse may refer to:

== Places ==
- Repulse Island National Park, Queensland, Australia
- Repulse Bay, Hong Kong
  - Repulse Bay Beach, a beach in Repulse Bay, Hong Kong
  - The Repulse Bay, a residential building in Repulse Bay, Hong Kong
- Naujaat, formerly Repulse Bay, Nunavut, Canada
  - Repulse Bay Airport
- Repulse Harbour, Greenland

== Shipping ==
- HMS Repulse, several ships of the Royal Navy
- Repulse-class ship of the line

== Other ==
- Repulse Power Station, Tasmania, Australia
- Repulse (arcade game), a 1985 arcade video game by Sega

== See also ==
- Repulsion (disambiguation)
