= Phyllotaxis =

Arrangement of leaves on the stem of a plant

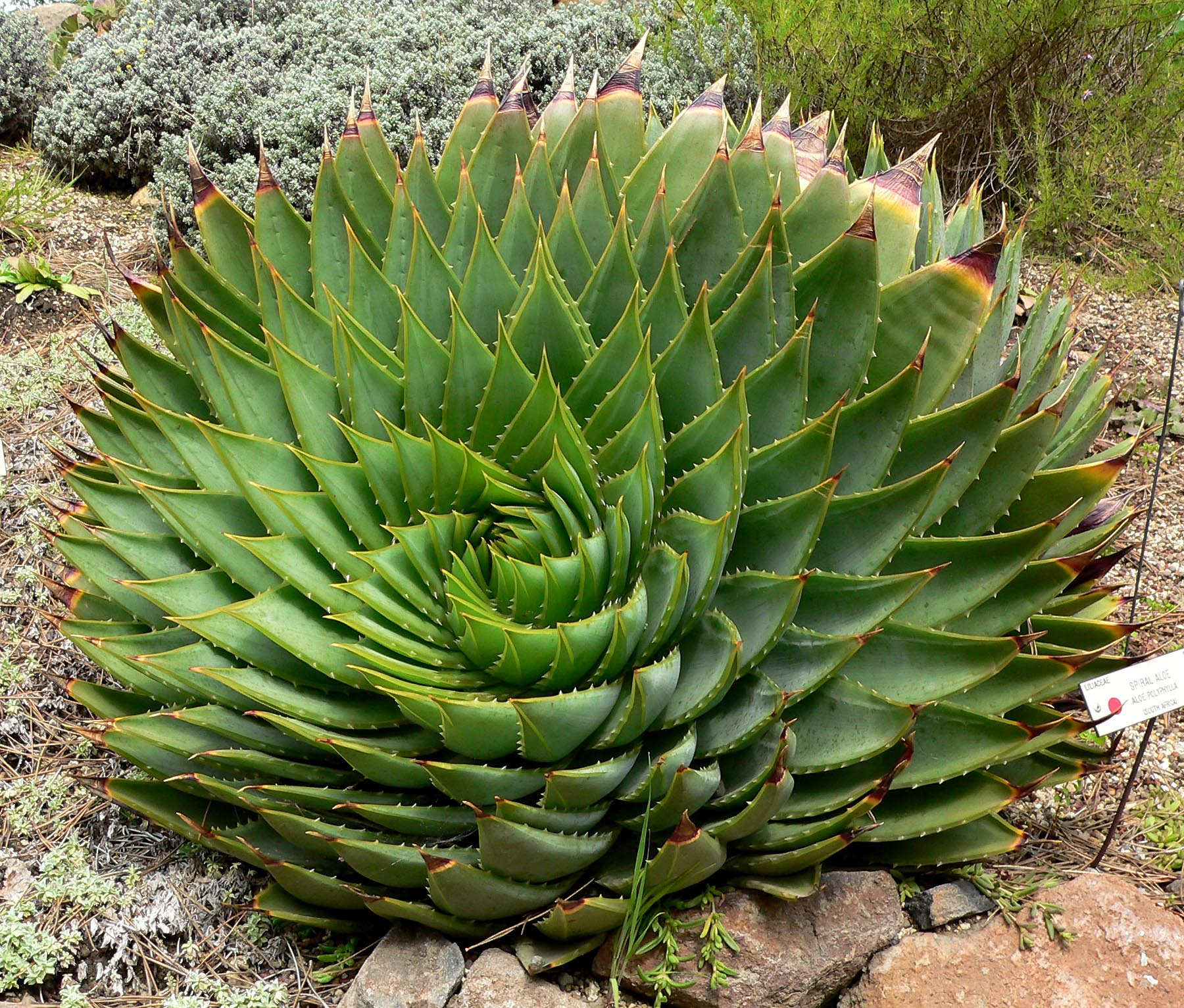
Crisscrossing spirals of Aloe polyphylla

In botany, phyllotaxis (from Ancient Greek φύλλον (phúllon) 'leaf' and τάξις (táxis) 'arrangement') or phyllotaxy is the arrangement of leaves on a plant stem. Phyllotactic spirals form a distinctive class of patterns in nature.

== Leaf arrangement ==
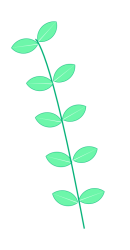
Opposite

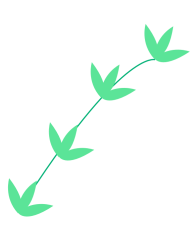
Whorled

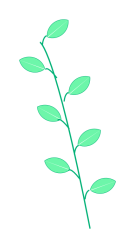
Alternate (a type of spiral)

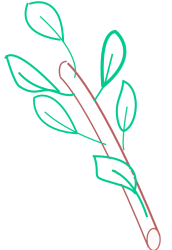
Spiral

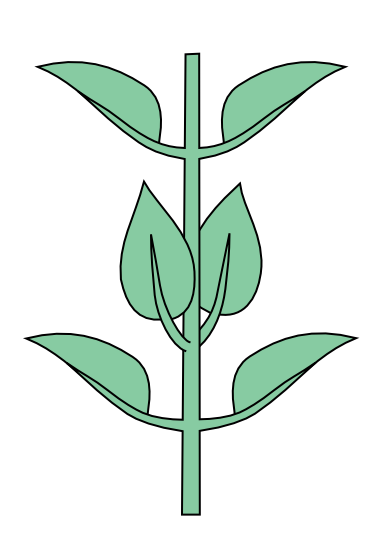
decussate

The basic arrangements of leaves on a stem are opposite and alternate (also known as spiral). Leaves may also be whorled if several leaves arise, or appear to arise, from the same level (at the same node) on a stem. With an opposite leaf arrangement, two leaves arise from the stem at the same level (at the same node), on opposite sides of the stem. An opposite leaf pair can be thought of as a whorl of two leaves. With an alternate (spiral) pattern, each leaf arises at a different point (node) on the stem.

Distichous phyllotaxis, also called "two-ranked leaf arrangement", resembles a fan-shape in form and is a special case of either opposite or alternate leaf arrangement where the leaves on a stem are arranged in two vertical columns on opposite sides of the stem. Examples include the Strelitziaceae, where this leaf arrangement is a feature.

In an opposite pattern, if successive leaf pairs are 90 degrees apart, this habit is called decussate. It is common in members of the family Crassulaceae Decussate phyllotaxis also occurs in the Aizoaceae. In genera of the Aizoaceae, such as Lithops and Conophytum, many species have just two fully developed leaves at a time, the older pair folding back and dying off to make room for the decussately oriented new pair as the plant grows. If the arrangement is both distichous and decussate, it is called secondarily distichous.

The whorled arrangement is fairly unusual on plants except for those with particularly short internodes. Examples of trees with whorled phyllotaxis are Brabejum stellatifolium and the related genus Macadamia. A whorl can occur as a basal structure where all the leaves are attached at the base of the shoot and the internodes are small or nonexistent. A basal whorl with a large number of leaves spread out in a circle is called a rosette.

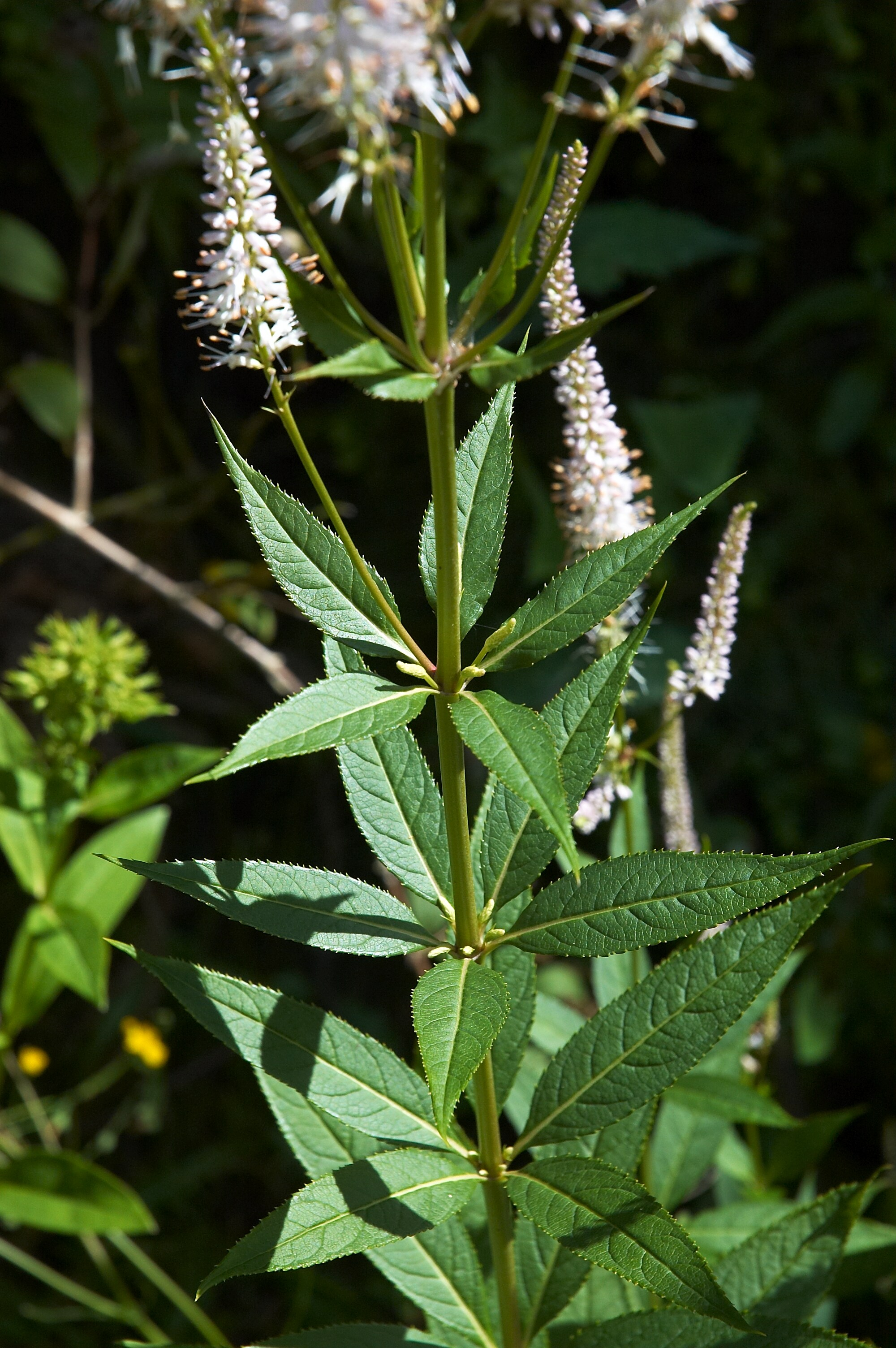
Veronicastrum virginicum has whorls of leaves separated by long internodes.

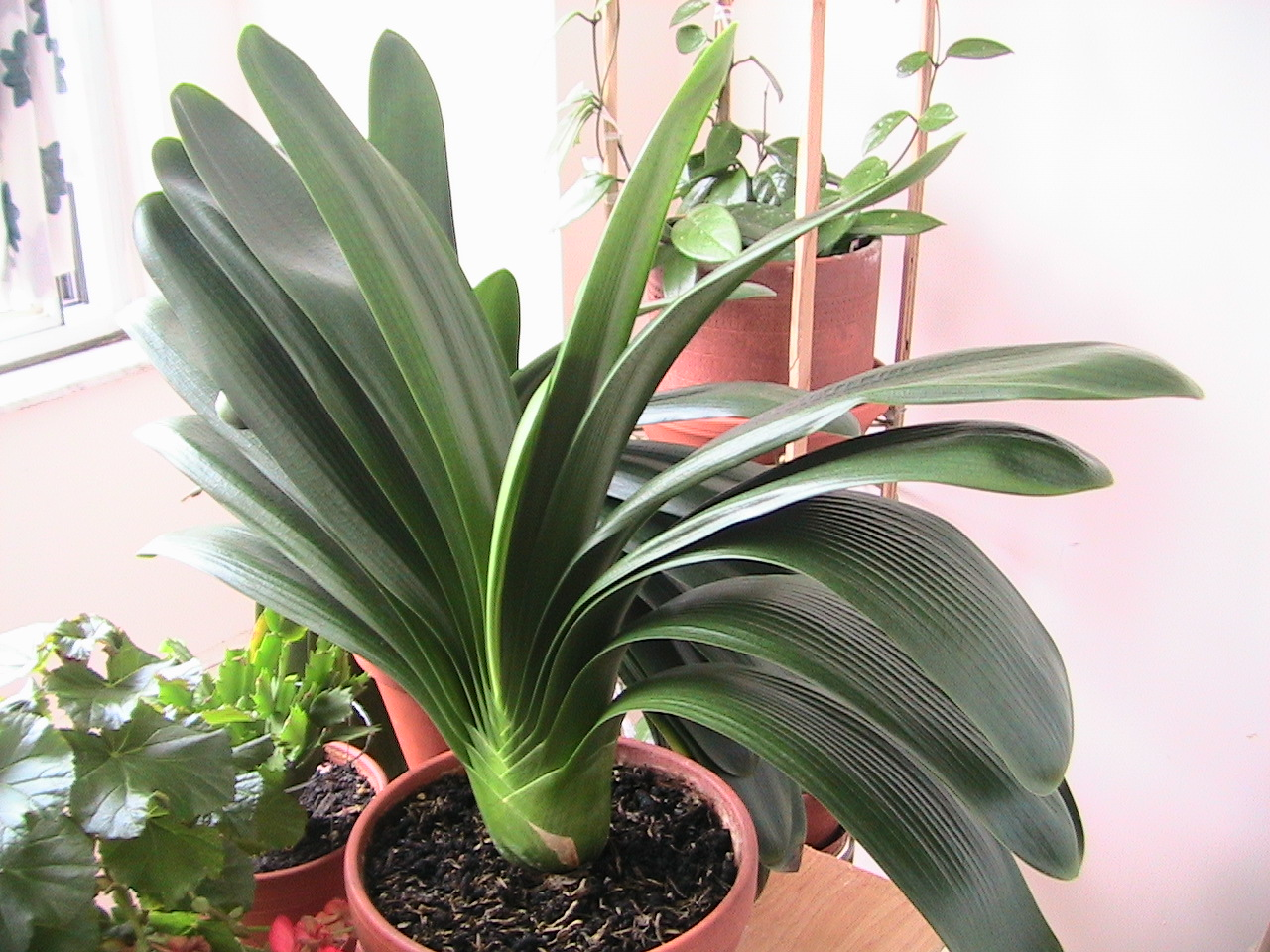
Distichous leaf arrangement in Clivia

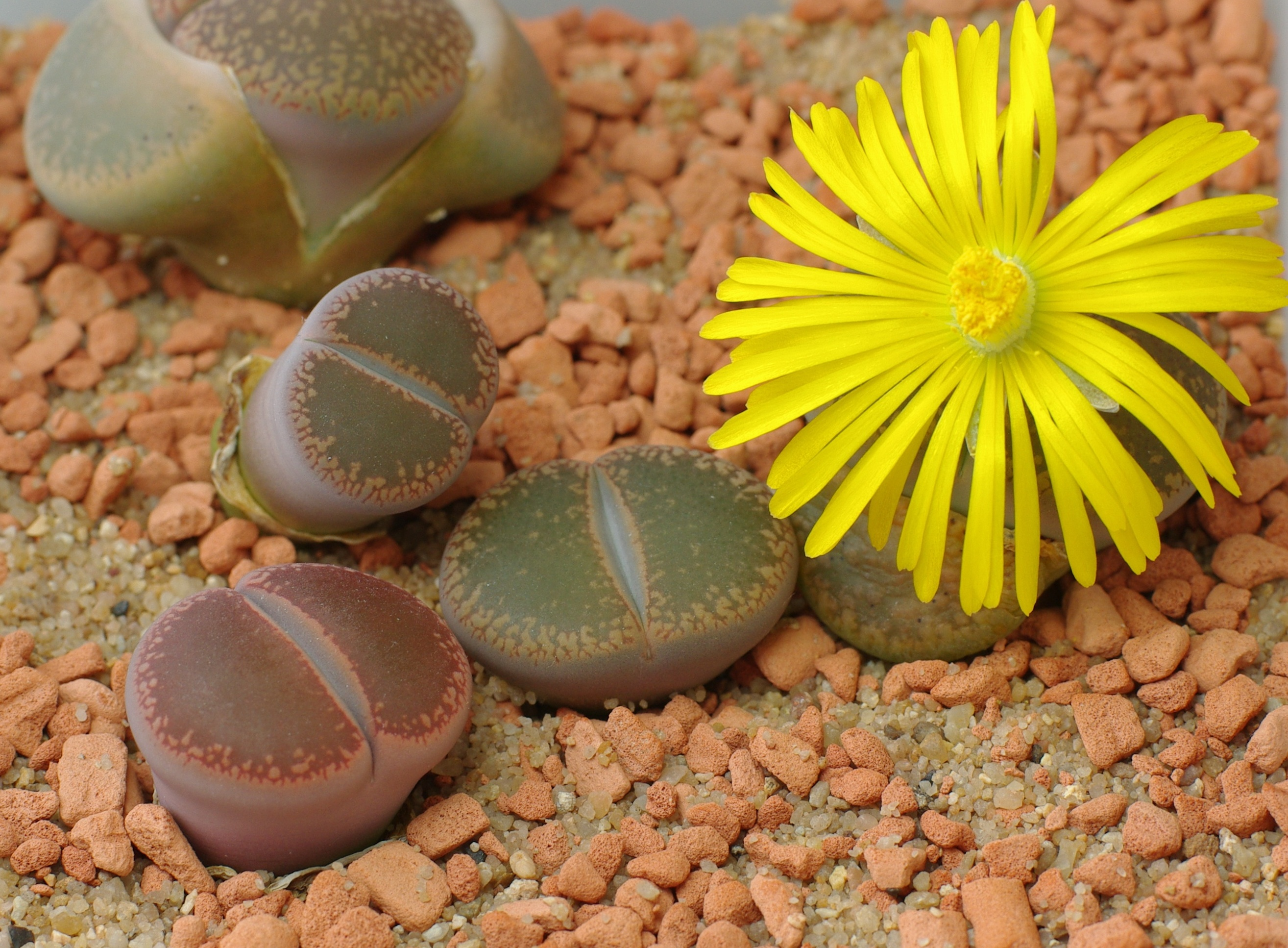
A Lithops species, showing its decussate growth in which a single pair of leaves is replaced at a time, leaving just one live active pair of leaves as the old pair withers

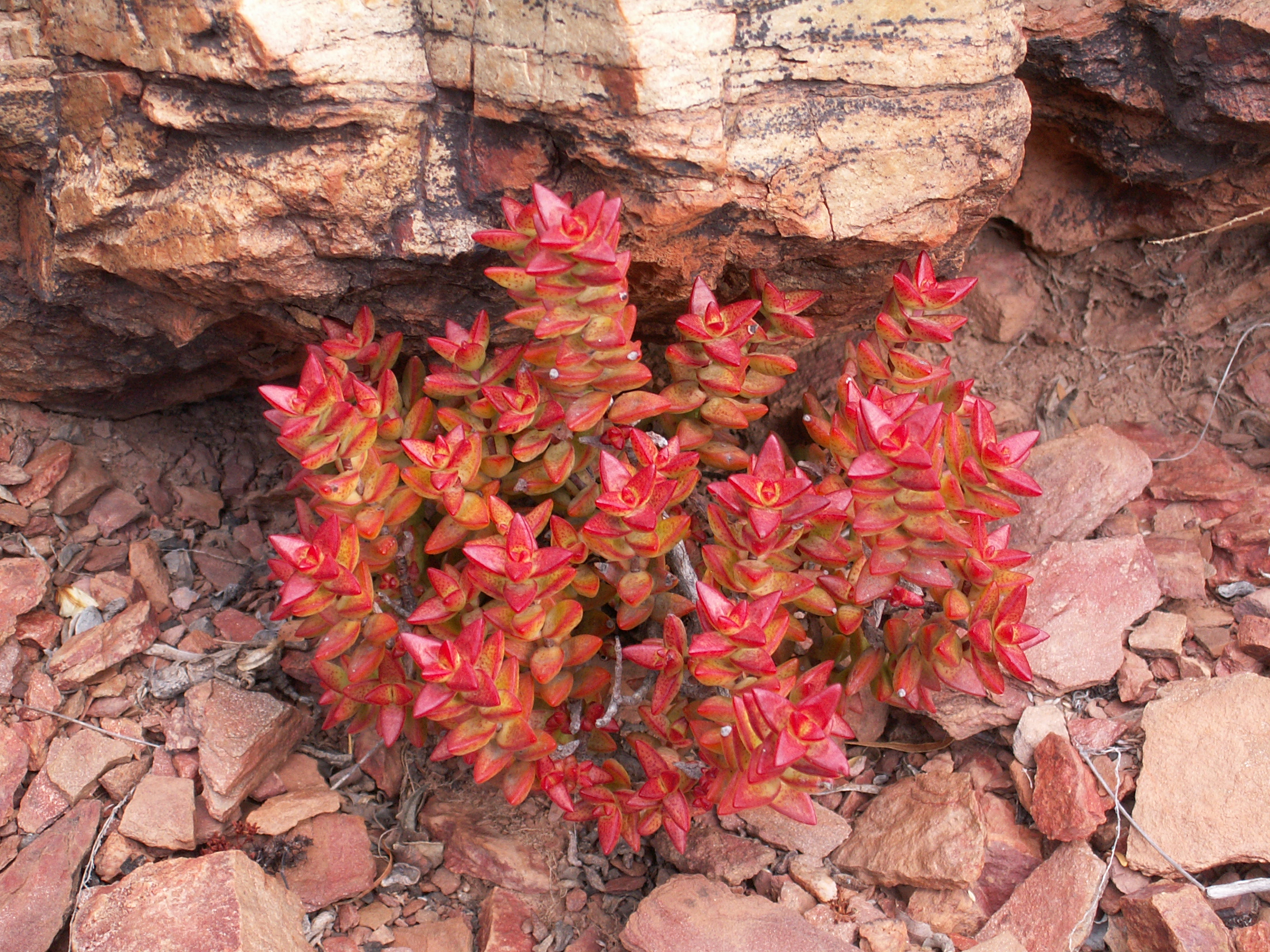
Decussate phyllotaxis of Crassula rupestris

== Repeating spiral ==
The rotational angle from leaf to leaf in a repeating spiral can be represented by a fraction of a full rotation around the stem.

Alternate distichous leaves will have an angle of 1/2 of a full rotation. In beech and vertical hazel twigs the angle is 1/3, in oak and apricot it is 2/5, in sunflowers, poplar, and pear, it is 3/8, and in willow and almond the angle is 5/13. The numerator and denominator normally consist of a Fibonacci number and its second successor. The number of leaves is sometimes called rank, in the case of simple Fibonacci ratios, because the leaves line up in vertical rows. With larger Fibonacci pairs, the pattern becomes complex and non-repeating. This tends to occur with a basal configuration. Examples can be found in composite flowers and seed heads. The most famous example is the sunflower head. This phyllotactic pattern creates an optical effect of criss-crossing spirals. In the botanical literature, these designs are described by the number of counter-clockwise spirals and the number of clockwise spirals. These also turn out to be Fibonacci numbers. In some cases, the numbers appear to be multiples of Fibonacci numbers because the spirals consist of whorls.

== History ==
Some early scientists—notably Leonardo da Vinci—made observations of the spiral arrangements of plants. In 1754, Charles Bonnet observed that the spiral phyllotaxis of plants were frequently expressed in both clockwise and counter-clockwise golden ratio series. Mathematical observations of phyllotaxis followed with Karl Friedrich Schimper and his friend Alexander Braun's 1830 and 1830 work, respectively; Auguste Bravais and his brother Louis connected phyllotaxis ratios to the Fibonacci sequence in 1837.

Insight into the mechanism had to wait until Wilhelm Hofmeister proposed a model in 1868. A primordium, the nascent leaf, forms at the least crowded part of the shoot meristem. The golden angle between successive leaves is the blind result of this jostling. Since three golden arcs add up to slightly more than enough to wrap a circle, this guarantees that no two leaves ever follow the same radial line from center to edge. The generative spiral is a consequence of the same process that produces the clockwise and counter-clockwise spirals that emerge in densely packed plant structures, such as Protea flower disks or pinecone scales.

In the early 20th century, researchers such as Mary Snow and George Snow continued these lines of inquiry.

== Plant physiology ==
The pattern of leaves on a plant is ultimately controlled by the accumulation of the plant hormone auxin in certain areas of the meristem. Leaves become initiated in localized areas where auxin concentration is higher. When a leaf is initiated and begins development, auxin begins to flow towards it, thus depleting auxin from area on the meristem close to where the leaf was initiated. This gives rise to a self-propagating system that is ultimately controlled by the ebb and flow of auxin in different regions of the meristematic topography.

== Mathematics ==
End-on view of a plant stem showing consecutive leaves separated by the golden angle

Physical models of phyllotaxis date back to Airy's experiment of packing hard spheres. Gerrit van Iterson diagrammed grids imagined on a cylinder (rhombic lattices). Douady et al. showed that phyllotactic patterns emerge as self-organizing processes in dynamic systems. In 1991, Levitov proposed that lowest energy configurations of repulsive particles in cylindrical geometries reproduce the spirals of botanical phyllotaxis. More recently, Nisoli et al. (2009) showed that to be true by constructing a "magnetic cactus" made of magnetic dipoles mounted on bearings stacked along a "stem". They demonstrated that these interacting particles can access novel dynamical phenomena beyond what botany yields: a "dynamical phyllotaxis" family of non local topological solitons emerge in the nonlinear regime of these systems, as well as purely classical rotons and maxons in the spectrum of linear excitations.

Close packing of spheres generates a dodecahedral tessellation with pentaprismic faces. Pentaprismic symmetry is related to the Fibonacci series and the golden section of classical geometry.

== In art and architecture ==
Phyllotaxis has been used as an inspiration for a number of sculptures and architectural designs. Akio Hizume has built and exhibited several bamboo towers based on the Fibonacci sequence which exhibit phyllotaxis. Saleh Masoumi has proposed a design for an apartment building in which the apartment balconies project in a spiral arrangement around a central axis and none shade the balcony of the apartment directly beneath.

== See also ==
- Anisophylly, a type of leaf size difference on horizontal shoots
- Available space theory
- Decussation
- Fermat's spiral
- Helical symmetry
- Glossary of leaf morphology
- L-system
- Orixa japonica
- Parastichy
- Plastochron
- Repulsion theory
- Three-gap theorem
- Sphere packing in a cylinder
