= Positive-incentive value =

Anticipated pleasure

Positive-incentive value is the anticipated pleasure involved in the performance of a particular behavior, such as eating a particular food or drinking a particular beverage. It is a key element of the positive-incentive theories of hunger.

== See also ==
- Incentive
