= Repulsive force =

Repulsive force may refer to:

- A repulsive force of an accelerating universe, which according to certain theories causes planets and matter to get further and further apart
- Like charges repelling according to Coulomb's law
- Repulsive force (magnetism) between magnets of opposite orientation
- A compressed material repelling bodies on both sides, e.g. according to Hooke's law
- Repulsive force (biology), associated with involuntarily vomiting, as in response to ingestion of a toxin

== See also ==
- Repulsion (disambiguation)
