= Ro (company) =

American telehealth company

Roman Health Ventures Inc.
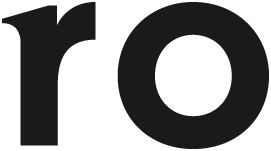
- Trade name: Ro
- Type: Private
- Industry: Health
- Founded: 2017; 9 years ago
- Founder: Zachariah Reitano (CEO); Saman Rahmanian (Chief Product Officer); Rob Schutz (Chief Growth Officer)
- Headquarters: New York City
- Website: www.ro.co

Roman Health Ventures Inc., doing business as Ro, is an American telehealth company that diagnoses patients, and subsequently prescribes and delivers treatments and ongoing care. The company is headquartered in New York City. Ro has nationwide telehealth, labs, and pharmacy services across the continental United States.

== History ==
Ro was launched as Roman in October 2017 by Zachariah Reitano, Saman Rahmanian, and Rob Schutz. Reitano's personal experience with a heart condition, and his desire to recreate his father, a doctor, out of software as a hologram, inspired him to co-found the company. Ro raised $3.1 million in a seed funding round led by General Catalyst and launched with a telemedicine practice, in addition to a pharmacy, to distribute medications. In September 2018, the company renamed itself Ro and expanded its treatment to additional pathologies like hair loss, cold sores, and premature ejaculation.

In 2018, Ro raised $88 million in a Series A funding round led by FirstMark Capital, and added Reddit founder Alexis Ohanian as a board director. In 2019, Ro expanded to offer services for women. In January 2020, Ro partnered with Pfizer for the sourcing of sildenafil. In July 2020, Ro raised $200 million in a series C funding round. In March 2021, Ro raised $500 million in a series D funding round led by General Catalyst, FirstMark Capital, and TQ Ventures, giving the company a $5 billion valuation. Margo Georgiadis, formerly the CEO of Ancestry.com, also joined Ro’s Board of Directors.

In 2021, Ro acquired Modern Fertility and Kit.

In 2024, Ro launched two new compounded erectile dysfunction medications, Daily Rise gummies and Sparks.

In 2025, a popular advertising campaign with Serena Williams relating to Ro's weight-loss injection program resulted in widespread controversy.

== COVID-19 response ==
In March 2020, Ro launched free COVID-19 telehealth assessments. Ro also partnered with Uber to give free COVID-19 assessments to all Uber drivers. Uber’s Chief Legal Officer, Tony West, later joined Ro’s board in September 2020. In March 2021, Ro partnered with the New York State Department of Health to launch an in-home COVID-19 vaccination program for seniors. In January 2022, Ro was able to supply COVID-19 tests during a shortage while the SARS-CoV-2 Omicron variant was most prevalent.

== Obesity treatment ==
Ro began treating obesity through supplying Gelesis100. In January 2023, Ro expanded obesity treatment through GLP-1 receptor agonists through its Body Program. An ad campaign for Ro’s Body Program on the New York City Subway was criticized for being too "evocative". After the medication gained FDA approval in 2023, Ro began prescribing Zepbound to medically-eligible patients through its Body Program.

In May 2024, in response to continual GLP-1 supply shortages, Ro launched a GLP-1 Supply Tracker to help people crowdsource information about medication supply and availability, receiving tens of thousands of reports from across the country. Later that year, the company also launched a free tool for anyone to learn more about their insurance coverage of GLP-1 receptor agonists.

In December of 2024, Ro announced that they were working with pharmaceutical company Eli Lilly to offer Zepbound vials via the platform through an integration with LillyDirect. Ro later announced an integration with Novo Nordisk to offer Wegovy at a reduced price. In January 2026, Novo Nordisk partnered with Ro, among other telehealth providers to offer the Wegovy pill, the first FDA-approved GLP-1 medication in pill form.

In 2025, Ro announced partnerships with Charles Barkley and Serena Williams for their GLP-1 treatment program. During the announcement, Williams told reporters that she partnered with Ro to destigmatize GLP-1s as a treatment for weight management.

== Platform ==
Ro patients fill out a dynamic online visit answering questions about their health, lifestyle, medical history, and symptoms. A physician then reviews the results and prescribes medication if appropriate. Medications are shipped directly to the patient's home. Ro's platform is vertically integrated with labs and pharmacies in the United States.

== Research ==
In October 2022, Ro reached an agreement with the National Institute on Aging to create a registry of patients for future Alzheimer's disease research and clinical trials. Ro has published research on a variety of telehealth topics, including comparable rates of side effects found with treatment via asynchronous and synchronous virtual care.

In October 2025, Ro announced that the company had partnered with leading researchers to develop the RAID-FN Inventory, a diagnostic test to help determine if someone had food noise, as well as its severity.

== Acquisitions ==
In December 2020, the company acquired WorkPath, which sends phlebotomists into patient homes to draw blood for diagnostic tests.

On May 19, 2021, the company announced that it had acquired women's reproductive health company Modern Fertility, in a deal reported to be over $225 million.

On June 30, 2021, the company announced the acquisition of Kit, a startup offering at-home diagnostic tests, including finger prick blood tests and weight measurement tools.

== Sponsorships ==
Ro has been the presenting sponsor of the College Basketball Invitational tournament, and an official sponsor of Major League Baseball. Ro sponsored NASCAR Cup Series driver Ryan Newman's No. 6 Roush Fenway Racing car at the 2020 Coca-Cola 600.
