= Dissenting opinion =

Opinion written by one or more judges disagreeing with the majority

A dissenting opinion (or dissent) is an opinion in a legal case in certain legal systems written by one or more judges expressing disagreement with the majority opinion of the court which gives rise to its judgment.

Dissenting opinions are normally written at the same time as the majority opinion and any concurring opinions, and are also delivered and published at the same time. A dissenting opinion does not create binding precedent nor does it become a part of case law, though they can sometimes be cited as a form of persuasive authority in subsequent cases when arguing that the court's holding should be limited or overturned. In some cases, a previous dissent is used to spur a change in the law, and a later case may result in a majority opinion adopting a particular understanding of the law formerly advocated in dissent. As with concurring opinions, the difference in opinion between dissents and majority opinions can often illuminate the precise holding of the majority opinion.

The dissent may disagree with the majority for any number of reasons: a different interpretation of the existing case law, the application of different principles, or a different interpretation of the facts. Many legal systems do not provide for a dissenting opinion and provide the decision without any information regarding the discussion between judges or its outcome.

A dissent in part is a dissenting opinion which disagrees selectively with one or more parts of the majority holding. In decisions that require holdings with multiple parts due to multiple legal claims or consolidated cases, judges may write an opinion "concurring in part and dissenting in part".

== Dissenting opinions by region ==
=== United States ===
In some courts, such as the Supreme Court of the United States, the majority opinion may be broken down into numbered or lettered parts, which allows those judges "dissenting in part" to easily identify the parts in which they join with the majority, and the parts in which they do not.

In the mid-20th century, it became customary for the members of the U.S. Supreme Court and many state supreme courts to end their dissenting opinions with a variation on the phrase "I respectfully dissent." In turn, the omission of the word "respectfully" or of the entire phrase altogether is now taken as a signal that the dissenting justice is particularly furious at the majority over the issue dissented upon.

It was more common in the past for Justices to dissent without authoring dissenting opinions. Between the Chase Court and the Hughes Court the dissents were often silent. Dissent began to increase with the Stone Court. William Brennan was known for telling clerks that the majority on the Court could do anything it wanted with five votes. By the Warren Court simple majorities had replaced consensus building. William Rehnquist, the most conservative justice on the Burger Court, became known as the "Lone Ranger" for being the lone dissent in so many cases.

=== Germany ===
In the proceedings before the Federal Constitutional Court (BVerfG), the fourth amendment to the Federal Constitutional Court Act of 21 December 1970 - in Section 30 (2) BVerfGG - introduced the possibility of a special vote. Since then, the decisions of the BVerfG can be accompanied by a minority opinion with the signature of the differing judge votes. The aim of the reform was to achieve greater transparency in court decisions and to strengthen the position of the individual judge. Special votes are also possible at some state constitutional courts in Germany. For example, Section 12 (1) of the Lower Saxony Law on the State Court provides for the corresponding application of Section 30 (2) BVerfGG. The Hessian State Court Law provides for an independent regulation on the possibility of a special vote in section 16 (3). Special votes are also permitted in arbitration proceedings.

The special vote is only permitted at constitutional courts. A minority opinion may not be published in all other courts. A judicial confidentiality obligation arises from § 43 DRiG, which protects the confidentiality of advice. The introduction of special votes in all courts was discussed in detail at the 47th German Lawyers' Day in 1968.

=== Italy ===
A minority opinion cannot be published in judgments of Italian courts. In Constitutional Court a minority vote can be just guessed in case of "showy, not negligible distinction between the reporteur and the editor". According to Sabino Cassese, the absence of the dissenting opinion penalizes the potential that the process of constitutional review of the laws would have arouse debates and awareness in the country.

=== Netherlands ===
Dissenting opinions are not permitted by the Dutch legal system, but the wording of a published decision may reflect the divergent opinions of the judges involved.

=== Czech Republic ===
Dissenting opinions do not have a long history in the Czech Republic due to its tradition of continental and socialist law. However, there has been an effort to encourage them in recent years and they are permitted for the judges of the Constitutional Court and the Supreme Administrative Court. Whereas, the dissenting opinions of judges of the Constitutional Court have been published ever since its creation in 1993 and some of them have had a significant effect on the subsequent case law and legal theory, judges of the Supreme Administrative Court can publish their dissenting opinions only since a 2012 amendment to the Code of Administrative Justice Procedure and this practice has not yet become significantly prevalent or influential.

== European Court of Human Rights ==
Even though Europe has a civil law tradition, the European Convention on Human Rights explicitly states that judges of the European Court of Human Rights may attach their dissenting opinion to the judgment at hand.

== Criticism ==
Susan Kiefel, Chief Justice of Australia, has expressed concern at the frequency of judicial dissents and the attention given to them by law students and legal commentators. She believes that they should be reserved for only the most important cases, and has described judges who frequently dissent as "somewhat self-indulgent". She further observed that "humorous dissent may provide the author with fleeting popularity, but it may harm the image the public has of the court and its judges".

== See also ==
- Dissent aversion
- John Marshall Harlan, "The Great Dissenter"
- Dissent
