= Mary Snow =

Botanist

Christine Mary Snow (Pilkington) (1902–1978) was an Oxford botanist who contributed to the study of geotropism and phyllotaxis. She is known for her co-development, with her husband Robin Snow, of the "Snow and Snow Rule": a new primordium (such as a leaf) appears in a plant as soon as and in the place where it has enough space to do so.

Mary Pilkington was the daughter of wealthy glass manufacturer Alfred 'Cecil' Pilkington (1875–1966). She was born in Rainhill, Lancashire, on 1 Aug 1902, and became an exhibitioner of St Hugh's College, Oxford in 1922. She graduated with first-class honours in botany in 1926 and was a research student at St Hugh's in 1925. In 1926 she became the first research student of George Robert Snow (1897–1969), a botanist and fellow of Magdalen College, Oxford, and was awarded the BSc, a research degree, in 1929. (Known by his nickname Robin, he published under the names R. or Robert Snow.) She was elected as a research fellow of Somerville College but was unable to take up the position because of her planned marriage to her supervisor Robin Snow in 1930. She continued to teach at Somerville and was later made an honorary research fellow both there and at St Hughs. From 1947 to 1958 she was curator of the botanic gardens.

After a trip to Jamaica in 1924, Robin Snow had acquired an undiagnosed illness associated with severe fatigue that affected his work for the rest of his life. The Snows lived in Headington from 1930 to 1960, when Robin Snow resigned his fellowship for health reasons. After five years living in Budleigh Salterton, the Snows moved to Vernet-les-Bains in the Pyrenees. Robin Snow died on 1 August 1969. Mary Snow died in 1978 in Perpignan. They had no children. Snow and her husband both enjoyed rock climbing and investigation of the paranormal.

Mary Snow's work was largely carried out in collaboration with Robin Snow. As his research student, she worked on the regeneration of stem-apices after splitting. This and their work tested the hypotheses of Hofmeister and van Iterson that new primordia would arise in the largest gaps left by previous ones, and largely relied on dissection of the growing stem of Lupinus albus under a microscope. In all the work published by them jointly, Mary Snow carried out almost all of the practical manipulation, they shared the interpretation of the results and the generation of new experimental ideas, while Robin alone wrote them up. All of the experimental work was carried out in their home, Southerway, in Headington, whether the couple frequently entertained undergraduates and research students. The Snows published a series of papers on the subject from 1931 onwards, which are still widely cited.

Mary Snow's benefaction to the Oxford Botanic Gardens made possible the development of their arboretum at Nuneham Courtenay.

== Selected publications ==
- Snow, M., & Snow, GRS. (1931). Experiments on Phyllotaxis. I. The Effect of Isolating a Primordium. Philosophical Transactions of the Royal Society of London. Series B, 221, 1–43.
- Snow, M., & Snow, GRS. (1933). Experiments on Phyllotaxis. II. The Effect of Displacing a Primordium. Philosophical Transactions of the Royal Society of London. Series B, 222, 353–400.
- Snow, M., & Snow, GRS. (1934). The Interpretation of Phyllotaxis. Biological Reviews, 9(1), 132–137. doi:10.1111/j.1469-185X.1934.tb00876.x
- Snow, M., & Snow, GRS. (1935). Experiments on Phyllotaxis. Part III. Diagonal Splits through Decussate Apices. Philosophical Transactions of the Royal Society of London. Series B, Biological Sciences, 225(519), 63–94.
- Snow, M., & Snow, GRS. (1947). On the Determination of Leaves.
- Snow, M., & Snow, GRS. (1959). Regulation of sizes of leaf primordia by older leaves. Proceedings of the Royal Society of London. Series B. Biological Sciences, 151(942), 39–47. doi:10.1098/rspb.1959.0048
- Snow, M., & Snow, GRS. (1962). A theory of the regulation of phyllotaxis based on Lupinus albus. Philosophical Transactions of the Royal Society of London. Series B, Biological Sciences, 244(717), 483–513. doi:10.1098/rstb.1962.0003
