= Aversion (film) =

- Promotional poster
- Directed by: GF Roberts
- Written by: GF Roberts; Ted Spencer
- Produced by: Sabrina Simone; GF Roberts; Karen Farinelli
- Starring: Andrew Roth; Melantha Blackthorne; Marc Raco; Richard Flight; Ted Spencer
- Edited by: Paul Strebor
- Production company: HYD Films
- Release date: March 30, 2009
- Running time: 99 minutes
- Country: United States
- Language: English
- Budget: $40,000

Aversion is a 2009 horror film directed by GF Roberts. The film revolves around a private investigator who discovers too late that the woman he is hired to follow is often possessed by a demon.

The original script, written by Roberts and Ted Spencer, combines demonic possession with science fiction. The film is somewhat retro in nature because it was shot on photographic film and that over ninety percent of the effects are in camera. Aversion provides some comic relief throughout.

The on-set special effects were provided by Monster in My Closet FX under the supervision of Jeremy Selenfriend. Other crew members included assistant director Sabrina Simone, Jared Noe and D Garcia.

== Plot ==
This original story marries three different elements into one plot.

Alex Stokes (Andrew Roth) is a self-destructive, down-on-his-luck investigator who takes cases wherever he can. When a mysterious man offers him a healthy sum to follow his beautiful wife Claire (Melantha Blackthorne), Alex can't resist. Her seemingly mundane day-to-day activities take a strange turn when she tries to kill herself.

After saving her, their chemistry proves too much to resist, and they become romantically entangled. But the fun has just begun as her demonic possessions escalate and Alex's entire town gets sucked into a vortex of evil. Can one lost soul get it together in time to save mankind.

== Cast ==
- Andrew Roth as Alex
- Melantha Blackthorne as Claire
- Marc Raco as Neil
- Richard Flight as Belial
- Ted Spencer as Dr. Cliff
- Janette Temerian as Liz
- George Walsh as The Sarge
- Josh Berresford as Cyril

== Production ==
=== Direction ===
GF Roberts has been shooting independent film in New York City for years. His projects range from comedy to horror and film to music videos. Starting with short films shot on video with his friends, Roberts discovered that he had a knack for telling stories with the camera. Years later, after scripting a feature film, which was produced, he joined the production team and never looked back. He began shooting film-based projects and after investing in equipment began his own production company. From there he learned the workings of the camera and after sufficient experience he hired himself out as a cinematographer, working on several films. He has also shot music videos and a spec television show. He recently completed “The Citizen Core”, which was an official selection in the Philadelphia Independent Film Festival and Sarah’s Demons, a horror short, was an official selection in the 2008 Bare Bones International Film Festival.

=== Filming locations ===
The movie's opening scene was shot in Pennsylvania. The interrogation scenes were shot in Brooklyn. The bulk of the film, though, was shot in upstate New York, mainly Woodstock, New York, the infamous site of the 1969 concert, Kingston, New York and Red Hook, NY. Although the film has various locations, it is not supposed to take place anywhere specific.
