= Dissent aversion =

Phenomenon in judicial decisions

Dissent aversion is the judicial phenomenon that implies that judges do not like dissenting opinions in the jurisdictions where they are possible nor do they like to dissent themselves. A common example is as follows: On a panel of three judges, only one feels strongly about the decision. One of the two remaining may side with the first judge, leaving the third judge with the option of dissenting on an issue they do not feel strongly about or siding with the majority.

Judges dislike dissent for many reasons. Dissent aversion can come from these sources:

- It frays collegiality (judges have to work together in the future).
- It magnifies the majority opinion.
- It is additional work.
- It detracts from the significance of their own majority opinions.

Dissent is more frequent in US federal courts of appeals where the number of judges is higher. According to some research, this is because the larger the court, the less frequently judges must work with each other and accordingly have less incentive to extend courtesy and favors.

== See also ==
- Publication bias
- Cognitive dissonance
- Selection bias
- Confirmation bias
