= Food noise =

Persistent and intrusive thoughts about food

Food noise is persistent and intrusive thoughts about food even when food security is not under threat. Although research is still in the early phase, definitions of food noise have emerged, and evidence suggests that food noise is distinct from hunger, food addiction, and food preoccupation. Instead, patients experiencing food noise report constantly ruminating about eating – when to eat, whether they are eating the right types of foods, or whether they are eating the right amount – or having self-recriminating thoughts about their relationship with food. These thoughts have a high cognitive burden and can cause distress, and it has been suggested that food noise may be a reason some people struggle to lose weight. For example, according to WW International, persistent food-related thoughts can make it difficult to adhere to a nutrition or exercise plan and make healthy food choices. In a representative survey of one thousand US adults, 50.89% of respondents reported experiencing food noise at least sometimes, and 17.98% reported experiencing it often or always.

== History ==
The origin of the term food noise is unknown, but it first appeared in a Google search in 2006. Google searches for “food noise” increased markedly in 2022, possibly due to the rising use of GLP-1 receptor agonist drugs (GLP-1 RA drugs) for weight loss. Growing public interest spurred attention from researchers, and the concept was first incorporated into a model of food cue reactivity (how the body and brain respond when a person sees, smells, or thinks about food) in 2023. However, other researchers do not see food cue reactivity as the sole trigger for food noise.

== Definitions ==
Given the increasing public interest in the concept of food noise during the early 2020s, researchers began to formulate formal definitions that could facilitate measurement of and studies about the phenomenon. The earliest published definition described food noise as "heightened and/or persistent manifestations of food cue reactivity, often leading to food-related intrusive thoughts and maladaptive eating behaviors".

A second definition, published in 2024 by a separate research group, described food noise as “persistent, intrusive thoughts about food that are disruptive to daily life and make healthy behaviors difficult.”

In 2025, another research group offered a third definition: “persistent thoughts about food that are perceived by the individual as being unwanted and/or dysphoric and may cause harm to the individual, including social, mental, or physical problems.”

== Measurement ==
Since 2024, two psychometric tools for measuring food noise have been developed.

=== RAID-FN Inventory ===
The Ro-Allison-Indiana-Dhurandhar Food Noise Inventory (RAID-FN Inventory) consists of seven items in the short-form version and 23 items in the long-form version. Both versions of the questionnaire capture three distinct factors of food noise: preoccupation with food, persistence of thoughts, and dysphoria arising from those thoughts. A reliability test conducted by the scale’s developers indicated that the food noise construct is likely stable (that is, a trait), although the dysphoric aspect may be a temporary state. Unlike the Food Noise Questionnaire (FNQ), no difference in the level of food noise experienced by men versus women was found using the RAID-FN Inventory.

The researchers who developed the RAID-FN Inventory noted that further validation of the tool involving in-person, in-clinic studies is required. Additionally, they suggested that future studies might investigate how the inventory responds to changes in food noise arising from the environment or therapeutic interventions.

The direct-to-patient healthcare company Ro provided funding for the RAID-FN Inventory’s development; however, the company had no control over the tool’s creation or the authorship of the validation study.

=== Food Noise Questionnaire ===
The Food Noise Questionnaire (FNQ) consists of five items associated with a single factor. The questionnaire is intended to be a brief tool for deployment in clinical and research settings that is also capable of identifying food noise correlates in various demographic groups. Initial testing of the questionnaire found that women and those dieting for weight loss purposes had higher scores, indicating greater levels of food noise. In contrast, individuals older than 55 years and retired persons had lower scores. The study authors cautioned, however, that further validation of the tool was required, specifically with those seeking treatment for obesity in clinical and nonclinical environments.

== Effect of GLP-1 receptor agonist drugs ==
Anecdotally, patients have reported that taking GLP-1 receptor agonist (RA) drugs quiets food noise. Moreover, many patients have said they did not register the constant mental chatter about food until it was gone. As of late 2025, only one unpublished study showing reductions in the impact of food noise resulting from taking GLP-1 RA drugs had been conducted using a validated scale. Further, the mechanisms by which GLP-1 RA drugs might dampen food noise are unclear. Some scientists have suggested that GLP-1 RA drugs act on brain pathways that affect appetite or reward signaling.

== Future research ==
Many aspects of food noise remain to be studied. Multiple future directions for research have been proposed, including the extent to which, how, and why GLP-1 RA drugs quiet food noise, how individuals’ experience of food noise relates to cognitive and physiological processes, demographic characteristics of those most susceptible to food noise, possible additional therapeutic approaches for managing food noise, and how public health policies may be implemented alongside food packaging, display, and information requirements to reduce the incidence of food noise.
