= Gerrit van Iterson =

This page was created from the Dutch Wikipedia with the aid of automatic translation

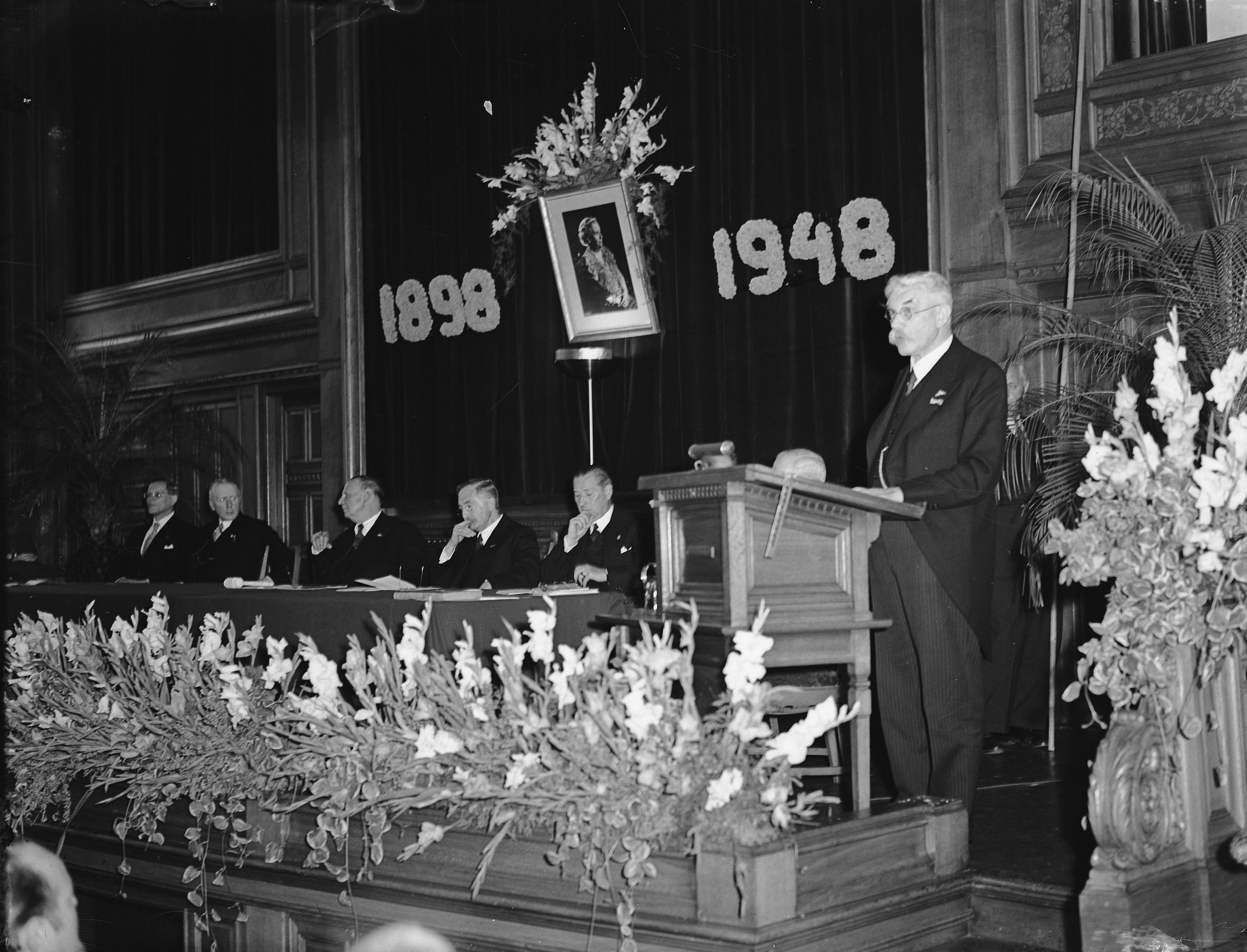
van Iterson at the podium: 50-year jubilee of Queen Wilhelmina

Gerrit van Iterson Jr (Roermond, 19 August 1878 – Wassenaar, 4 January 1972) was a Dutch botanist and professor who developed a mathematical approach to plant growth (phyllotaxis).

== Biography ==
Gerrit van Iterson studied in the Department of Chemical Engineering at the Polytechnic in Delft from 1897 to 1901. He studied chemistry under H. Behrens and microbiology under Martinus Willem Beijerinck. He got a PhD in 1907 with a thesis on phyllotaxis, where he fielded a mathematical theory for leaf growth (Mathematical und Studien über microscopic anatomical Blattstellungen, etc.). He also created a diagram that came to be called the van Iterson Diagram, based on his studies of how spheres can be arranged in a regular cylindrical pattern called a 'rhombic lattice'. Smith College's "About Phyllotaxis" page notes that the van Iterson Diagram of plant growth is related to a tiling of the hyperbolic plane.

The thesis was somewhat forgotten during the twentieth century, but since the recent work of Stéphane Douady and Yves Couder, it has gained attention.

Iterson became professor at Delft. He was also the founder of the Cultuurtuin Technical Crops, today known as the TU Delft Hortus Botanicus. In 1918 he became a member of the Royal Netherlands Academy of Arts and Sciences. He retired in 1948.

== See also ==
- Tessellation
- Parastichy

== Bibliography ==
- A.D.J. Meeuse, Life Message G. of Iterson 1972, Amsterdam, pp . 122-126
