= Repulsion theory =

Theory used to explain how plants regulate distance between new budding leaves on a steam

In botany, Repulsion theory is a theory that is used to explain how plants regulate the distance between new budding leaves on a stem. The theory states that each leaf on a stem secretes a substance that inhibits growth of a new leaf. A new leaf will only grow a certain distance away from the previous leaf where the concentration of the substance reaches a lower level. Although no inhibitors have yet been discovered, the theory is supported by several surgical and modeling experiments.

== See also ==
- Phyllotaxis
- Available space theory
