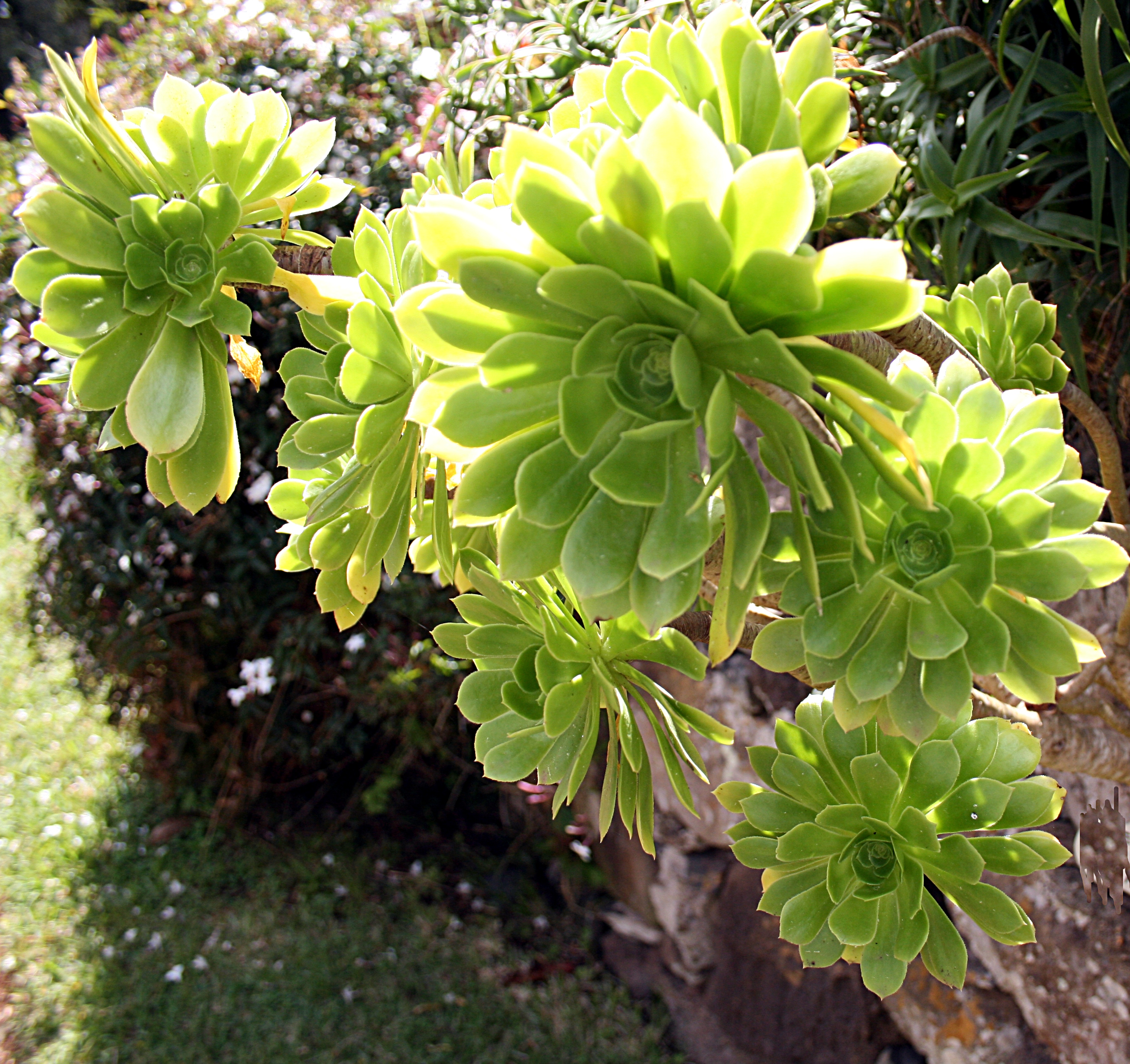

Scientific classification
- Kingdom: Plantae
- Clade: Tracheophytes
- Clade: Angiosperms
- Clade: Eudicots
- Order: Saxifragales
- Family: Crassulaceae
- Genus: Aeonium
- Species: A. arboreum

Binomial name
- Aeonium arboreum (L.) Webb & Berthel.

Synonyms
- Aeonium doramae Webb ex A.Berger nom. inval.; Aeonium doremae Webb ex Christ; Aeonium holochrysum Webb & Berthel.; Aeonium manriqueorum Bolle; Aeonium rubrolineatum Svent.; Aeonium vestitum Svent.; Sempervivum arboreum L.; Sempervivum urbicum Lindl. nom. illeg.

= Aeonium arboreum =

Tree aeonium

Species of succulent

Aeonium arboreum, the tree aeonium, tree houseleek, or Irish rose, is a succulent, subtropical subshrub in the flowering plant family Crassulaceae.

== Description ==
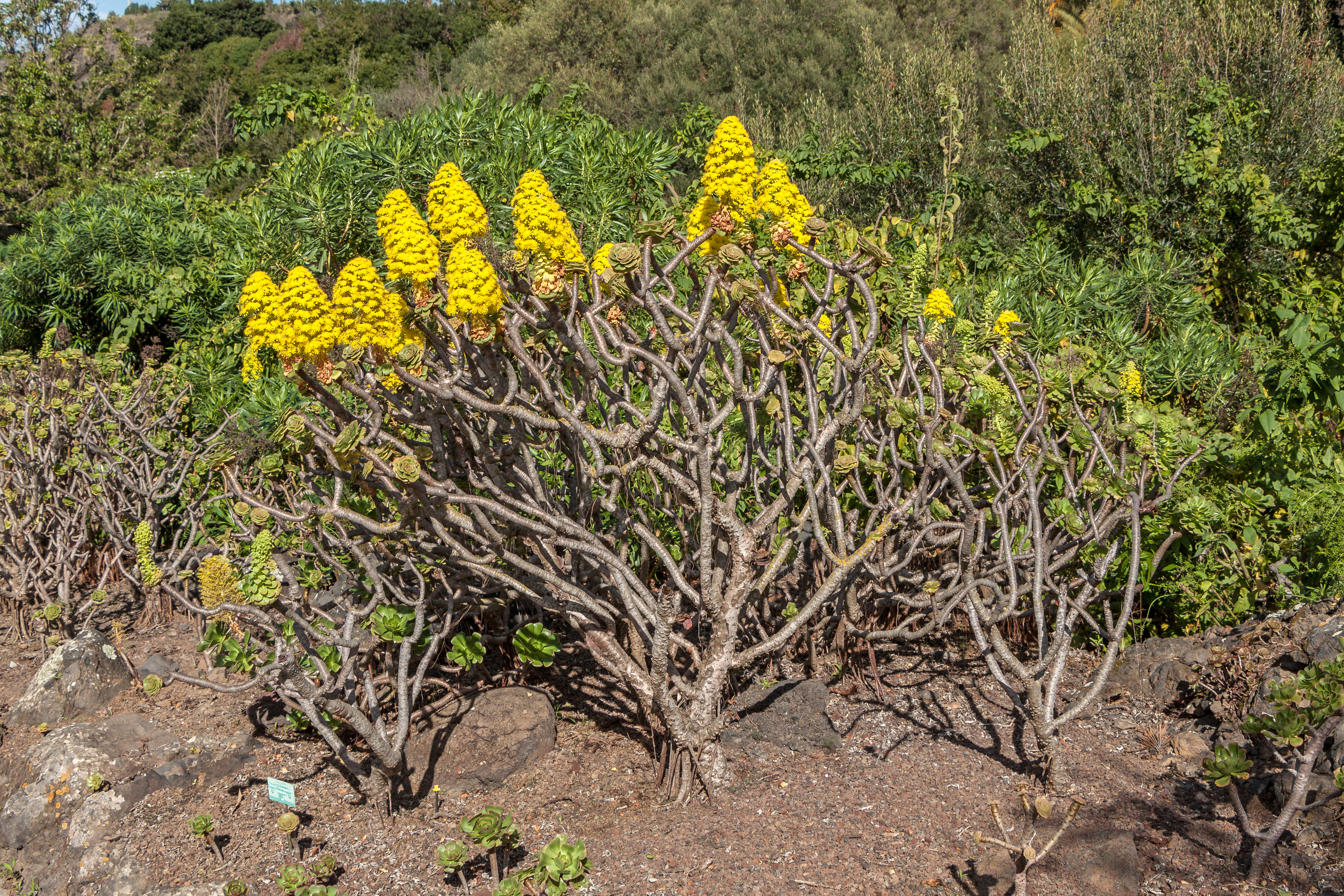
Aeonium arboreum in a bush setting.

Aeonium arboreum grows as a less branched subshrub and reaches stature heights of up to 2 metres. The more or less upright or ascending, smooth, not net-like patterned stem axes have a diameter of 1 to 3 centimetres.

Their leaves are in flattened rosettes with diameters of 10 to 25 centimetres at the end of the stem axes together. Young leaves are pressed tightly together. The obovate to oblate lanceolate leaf blade is pointed toward its apex and wedge-shaped at the base. It is 130 to 380 mm (5 to 15 in) long, 25 to 115 mm (1 to 4 1/2 in) wide and 1.5 to 3 millimetres thick. The green, usually purple-colored, glossy leaf surface is almost bare. The leaf margin is set with curved eyelashes.

The conical to ovate inflorescence has a length of 10 to 25 centimetres and a diameter of 10 to 15 centimetres. The inflorescence stem is 130 to 510 mm (5 to 20 in) long. The flowers sit on a 2-to-12-millimetre-long, slightly fluffy flower stem. Its sepals are also slightly fluff-haired with a pointed top and wedge-shaped base that is smooth and shiny green, red or purple. The yellow, narrow oblong to lanceolate, pointed petals are 5 to 7 millimetres long and 1.5 to 2 millimetres wide. The stamens are bare. It bears rosettes of leaves and large pyramidal panicles of bright yellow flowers in the spring.

== Distribution ==
The plant is endemic to the western Canary Islands of Tenerife, La Palma, El Hierro, La Gomera and Gran Canaria. The populations found on the Iberian Peninsula, the Moroccan coast and the Mediterranean are likely to be considered neophytes. In colder temperate regions it needs to be grown under glass; however, in temperate regions with mild winters they are perennial.

== Cultivation ==
Aeonium arboreum is summer-dormant and grows primarily during the cooler months. Best temperatures for growth are approximately 10–24 °C. Survives frosts up to approximately −2 to −3 °C. Prolonged summer heat can induce dormancy. Plants tolerate prolonged drought with intense sunlight, making it suitable for low-maintenance, unirrigated Mediterranean gardens. The species is widely cultivated in Mediterranean-climate regions. Commonly cultivated purple-leaved cultivars include 'Atropurpureum' and 'Zwartkop'.

Aeonium arboreum grows in sunny or slightly shaded places on weathered volcanic soil. The purple cultivar 'Zwartkop' ('Schwartzkopf') has gained the Royal Horticultural Society's Award of Garden Merit. A variegated form is grown as cultivar 'variegatum'.

== Subspecies ==
Three subspecies are accepted.

- Aeonium arboreum subsp. arboreum – northern and central Gran Canaria
- Aeonium arboreum subsp. holochrysum (H.Y.Liu) Bañares – Canary Islands
- Aeonium arboreum subsp. korneliuslemsii (H.Y.Liu) Dobignard (synonym Aeonium korneliuslemsii H.Y.Liu) – southwestern Morocco

== Gallery ==
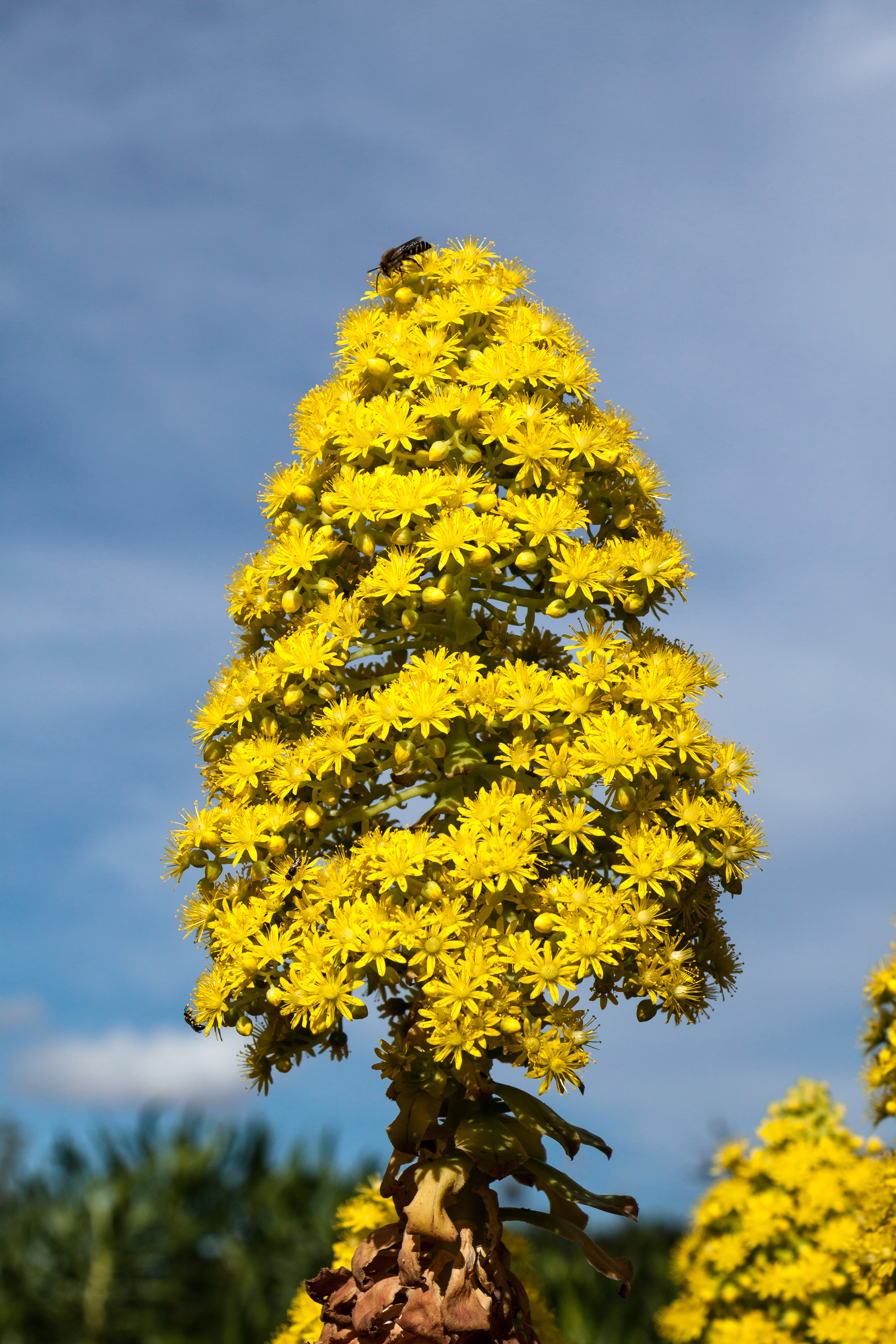
Inflorescence

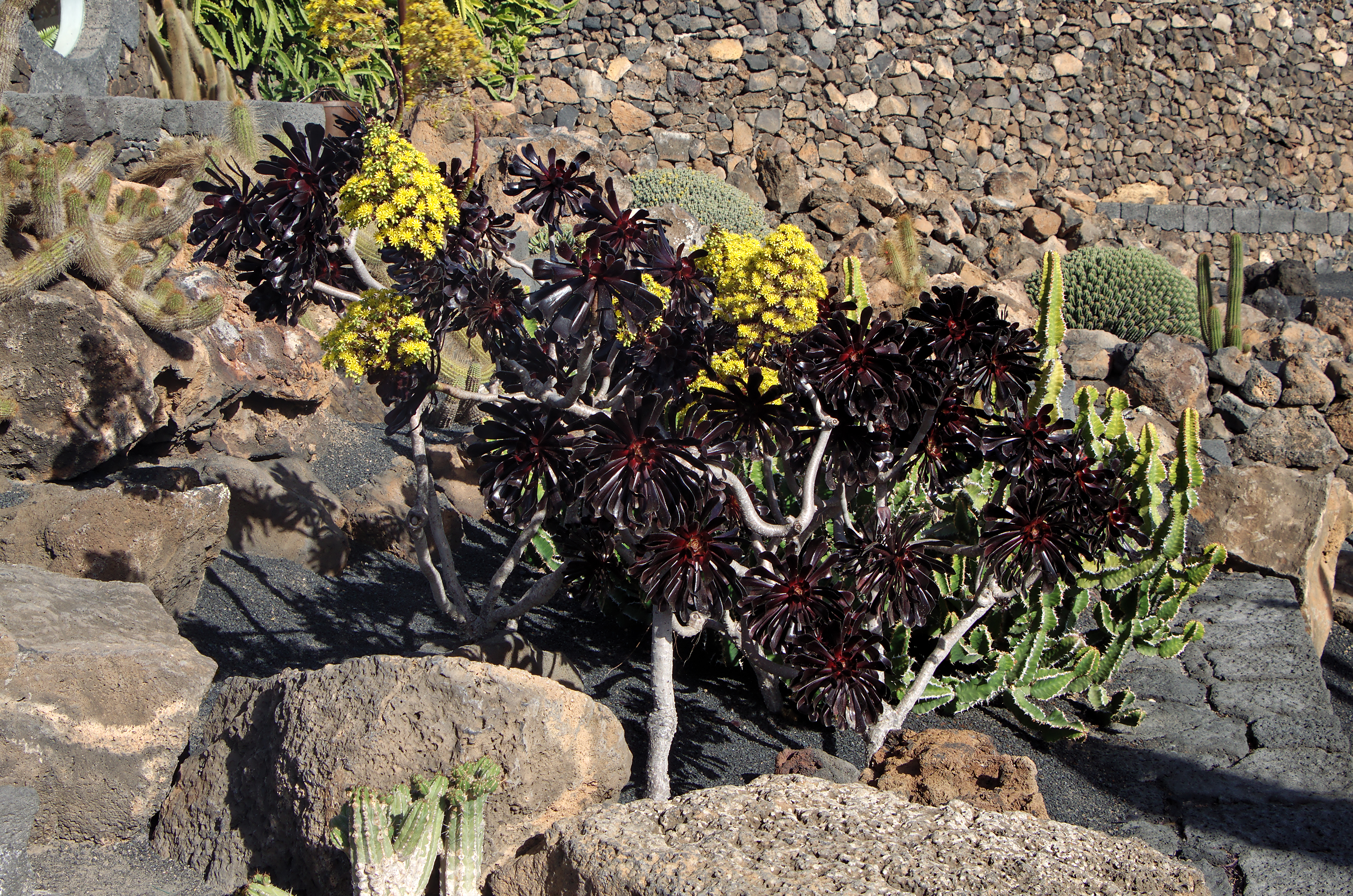
Aeonium arboreum 'Atropurpureum'

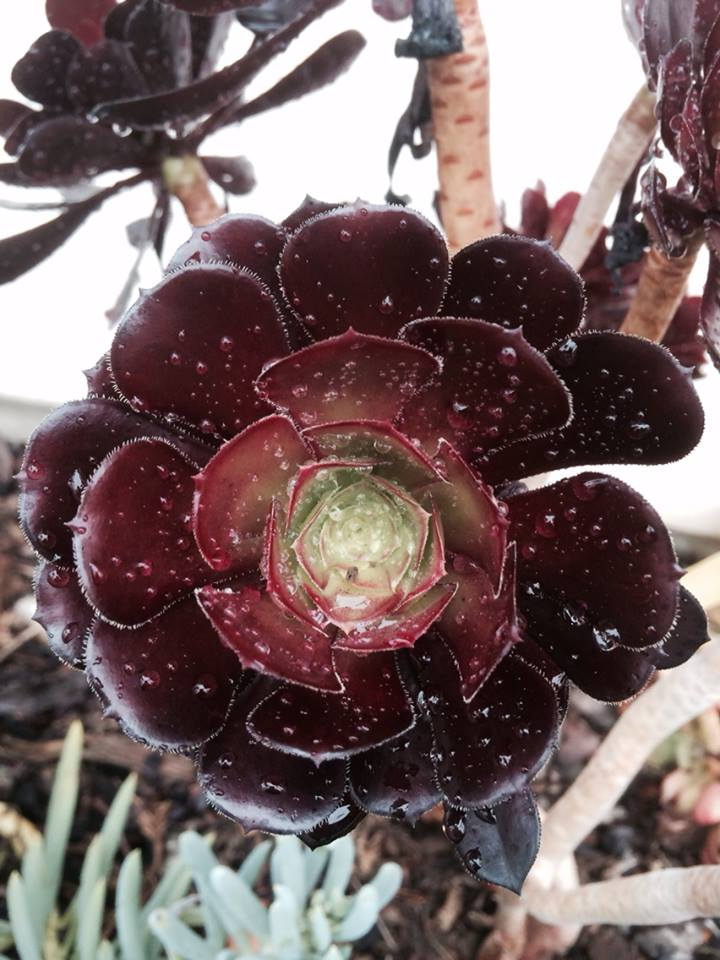
Aeonium arboreum 'Zwartkop'

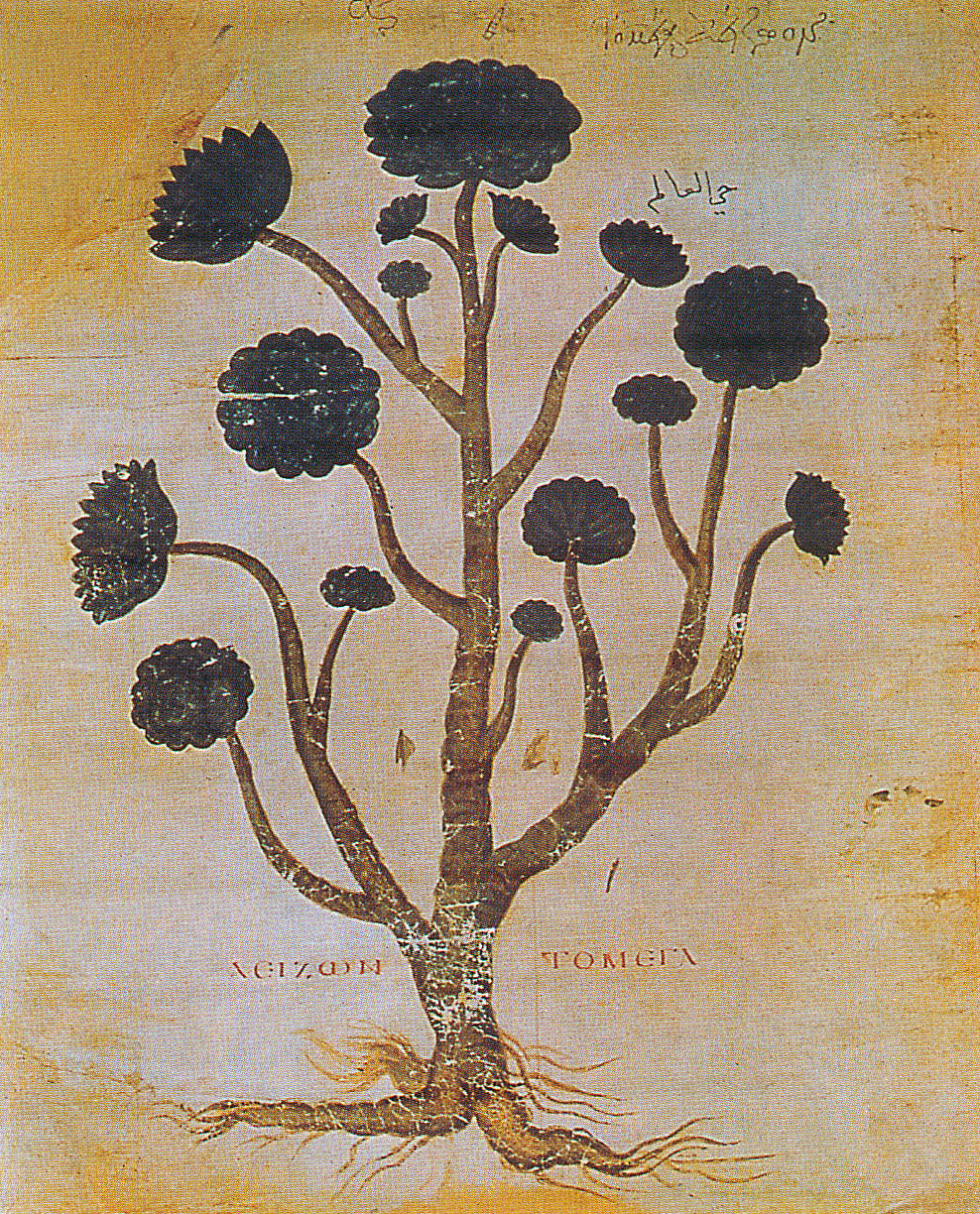
Botanical illustration

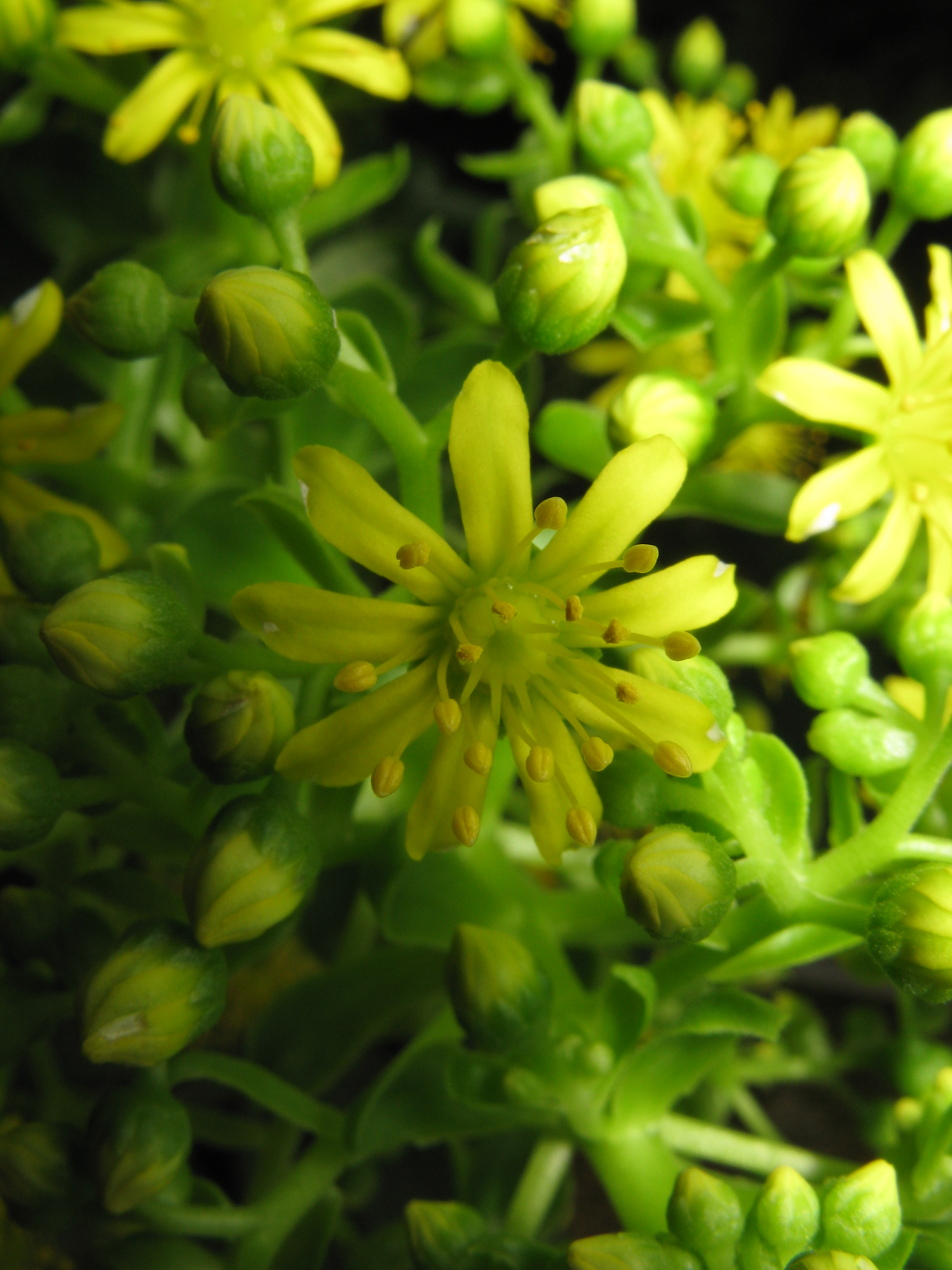
Flower close up

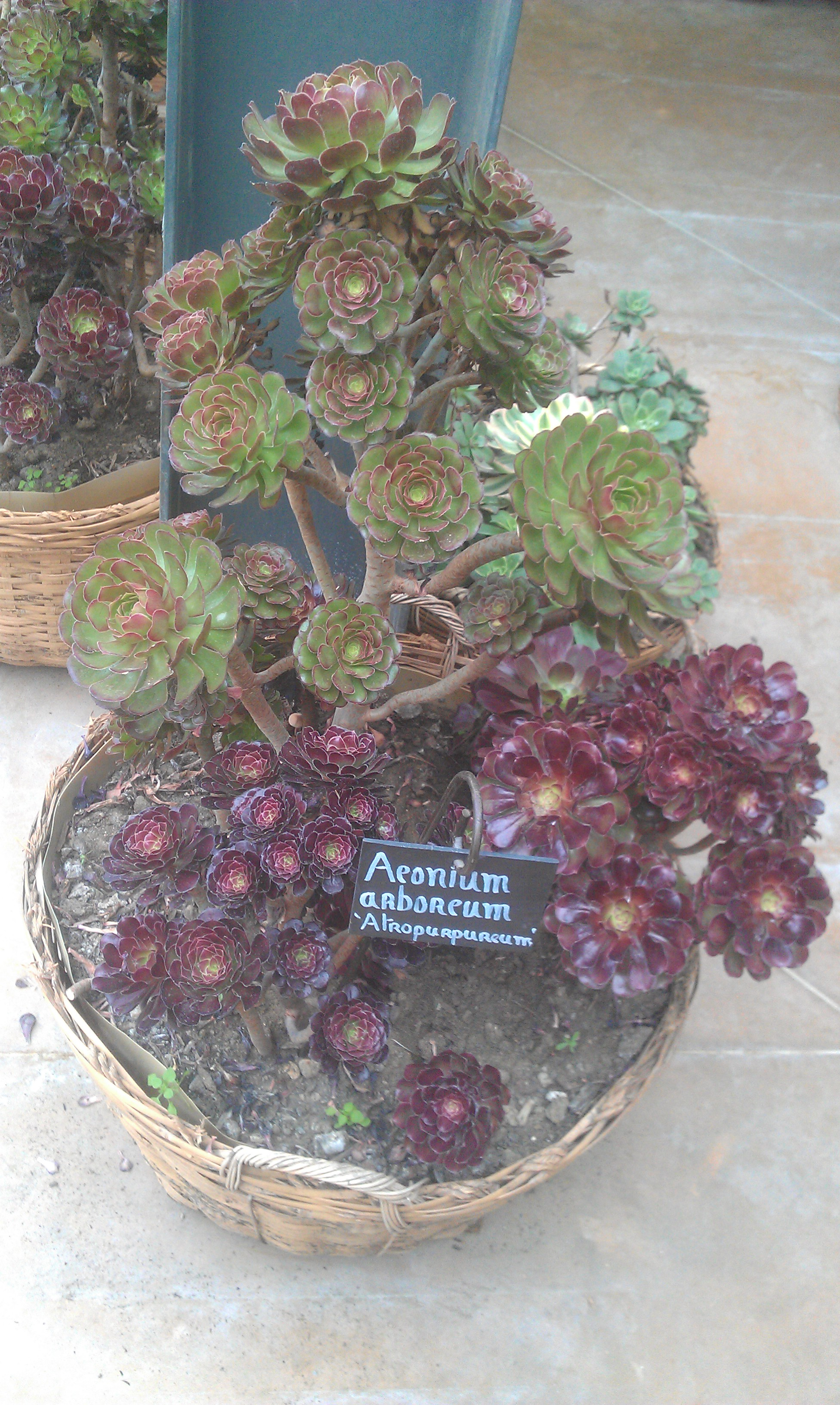
Potted

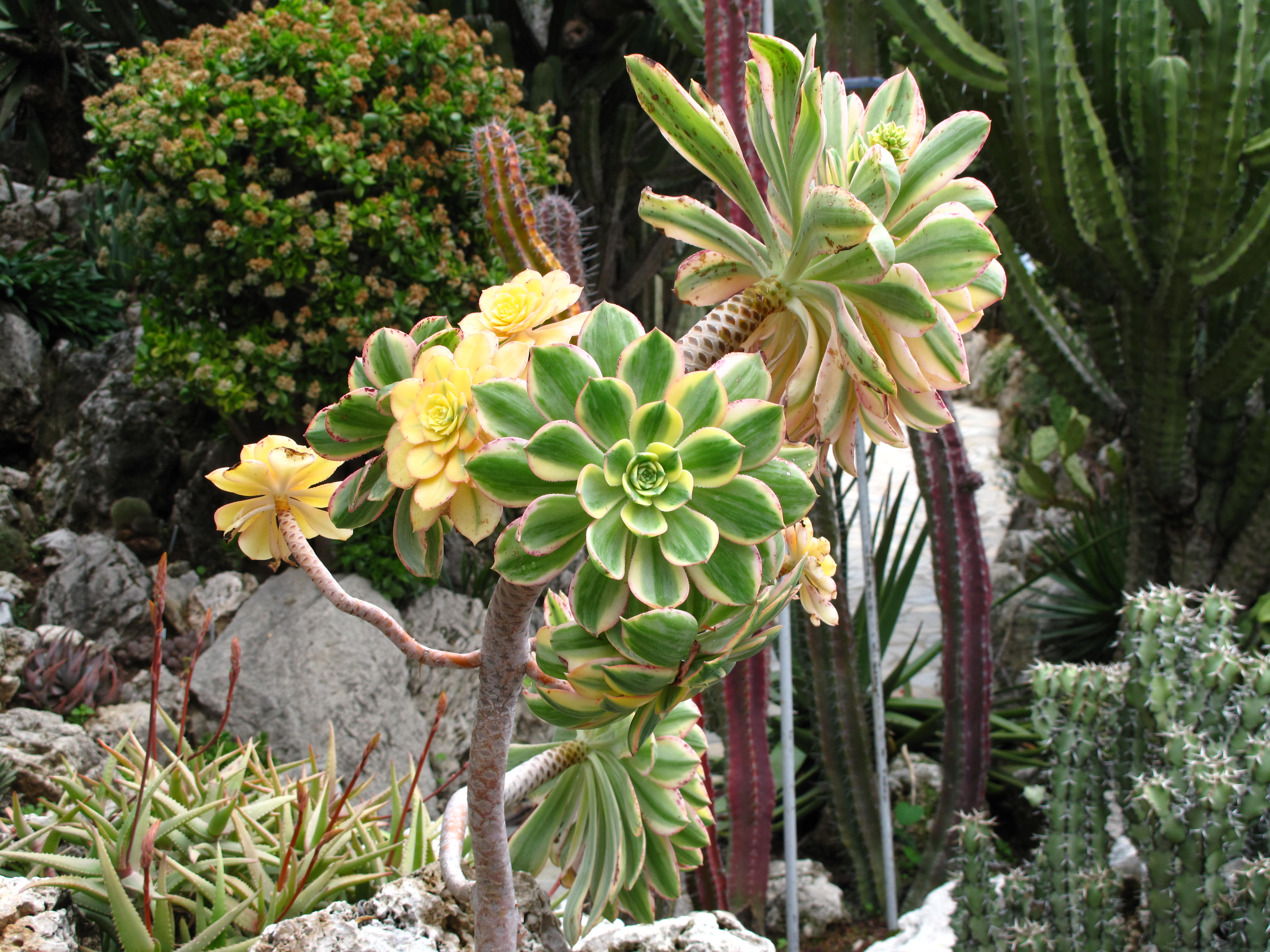
Variegated

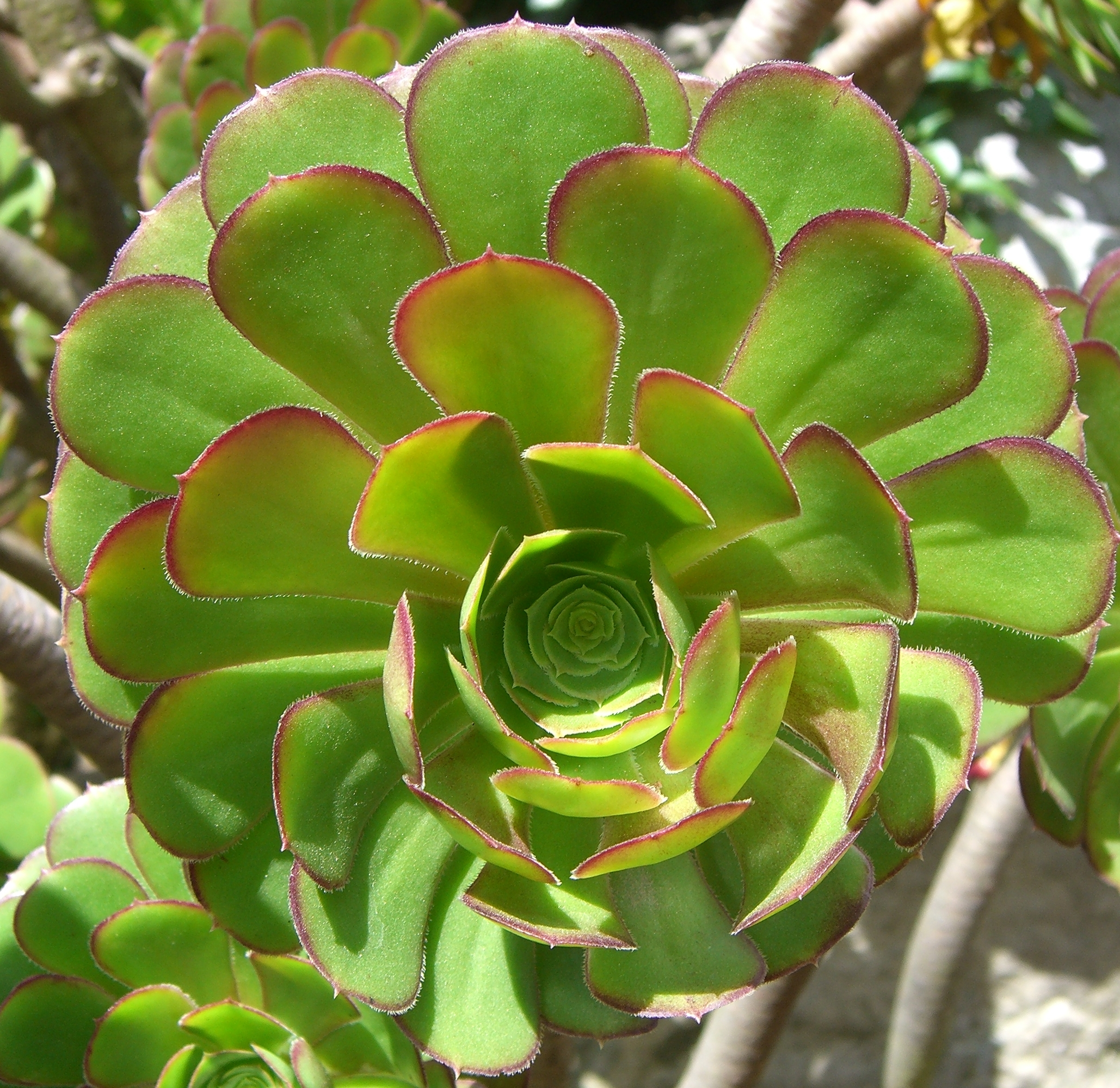
Rosette of leaves

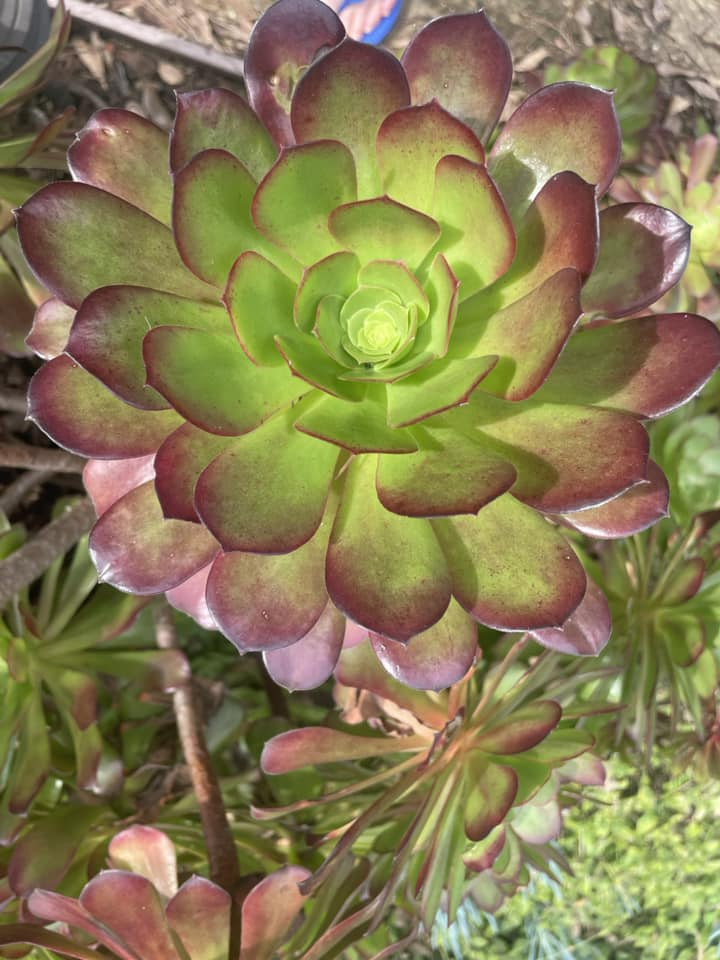
Rosetta mutating into a color.

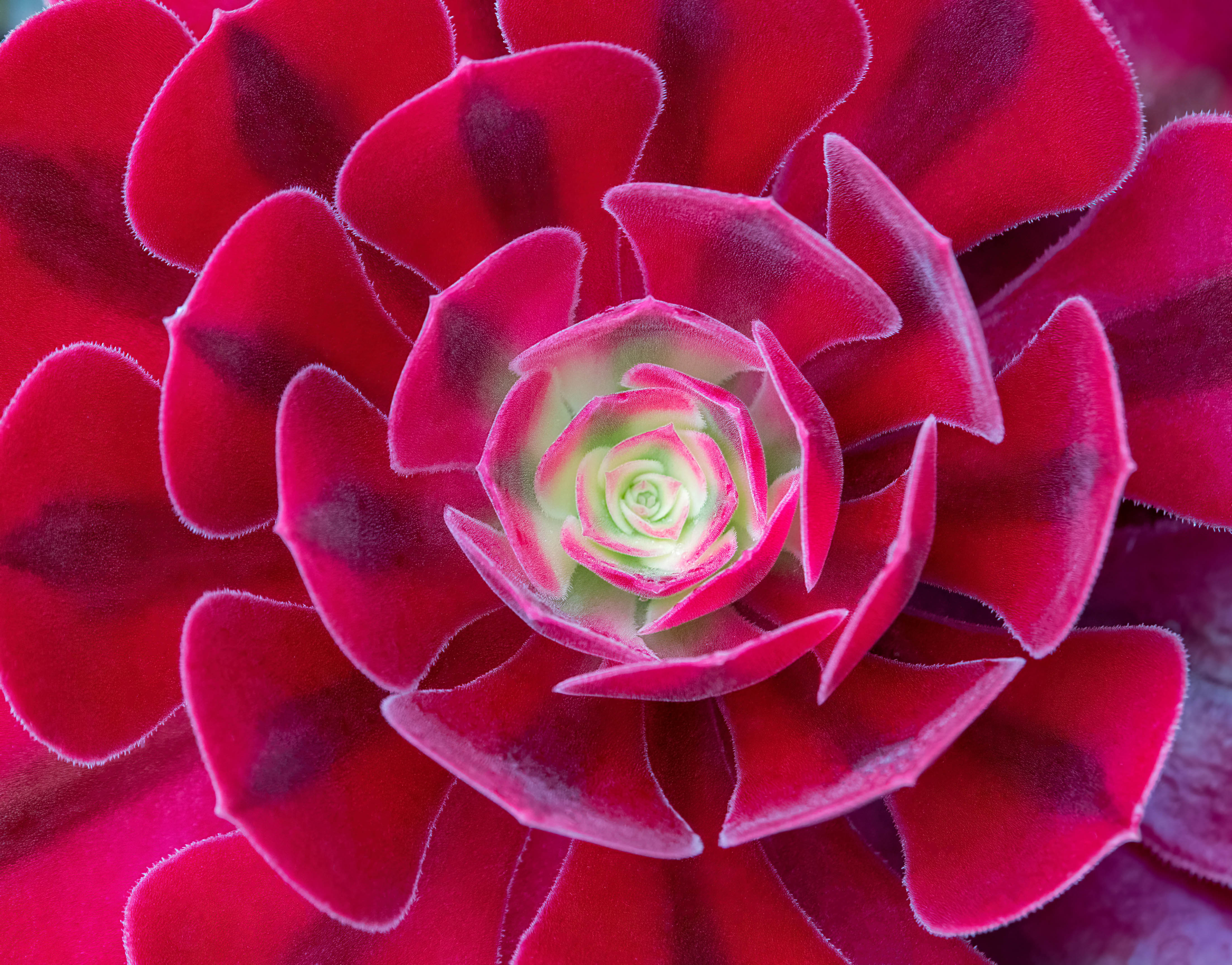
Aeonium arboreum to a "Medusa".

Zwartkop during summer dormancy
