= Food aversion =

Food aversion may refer to:

- Anorexia nervosa, an eating disorder in which people avoid eating due to concerns about body weight or body image
- Food neophobia, the fear of eating new or unfamiliar foods, commonly observed in children
- Avoidant/restrictive food intake disorder, an eating disorder in which people avoid eating or eat only a very narrow range of foods
- Conditioned food aversion, also known as poison shyness, the avoidance of a toxic substance by an animal that has previously ingested that substance
