= Parastichy =

Spiral pattern of organs on plants

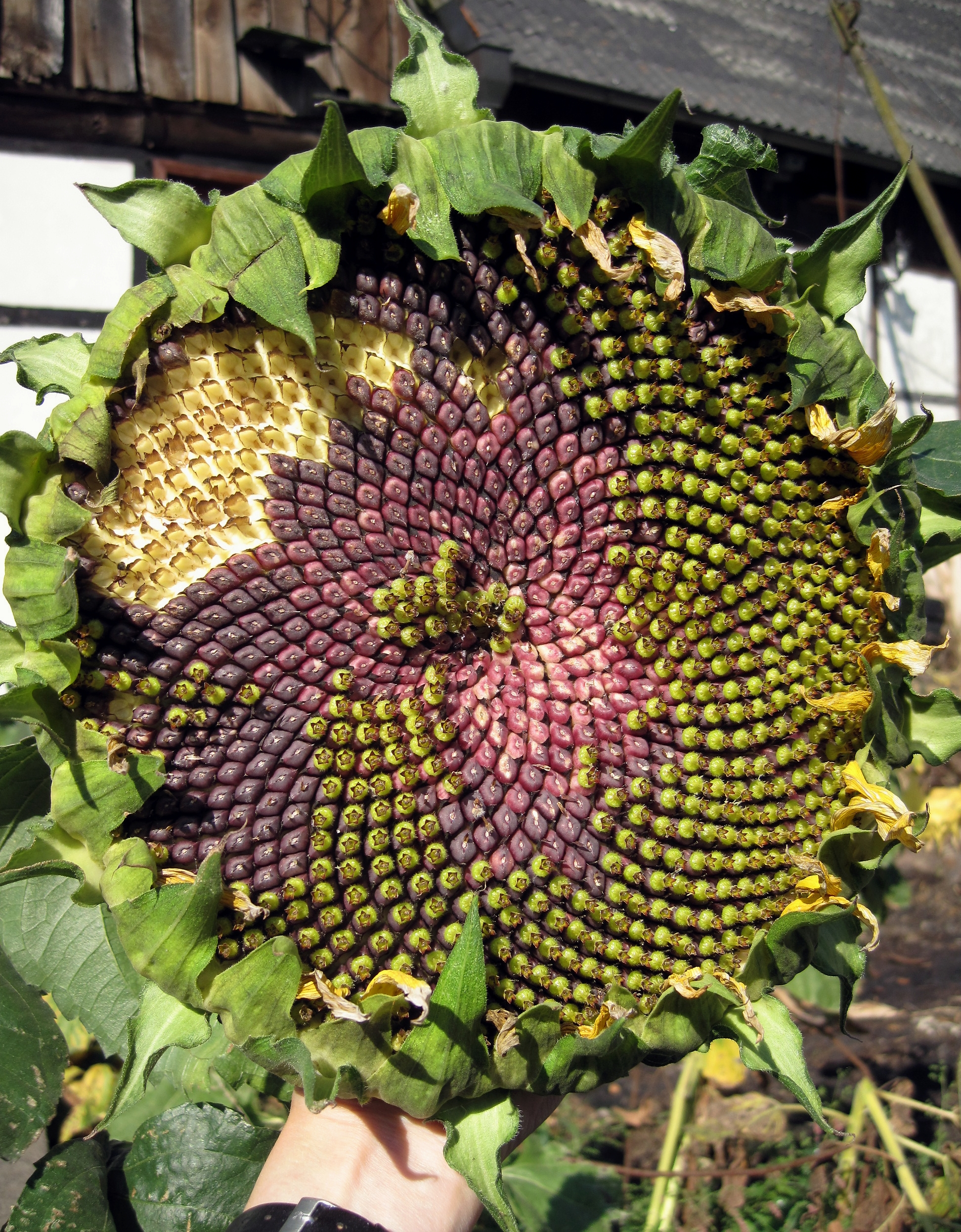
Spirals on a sunflower

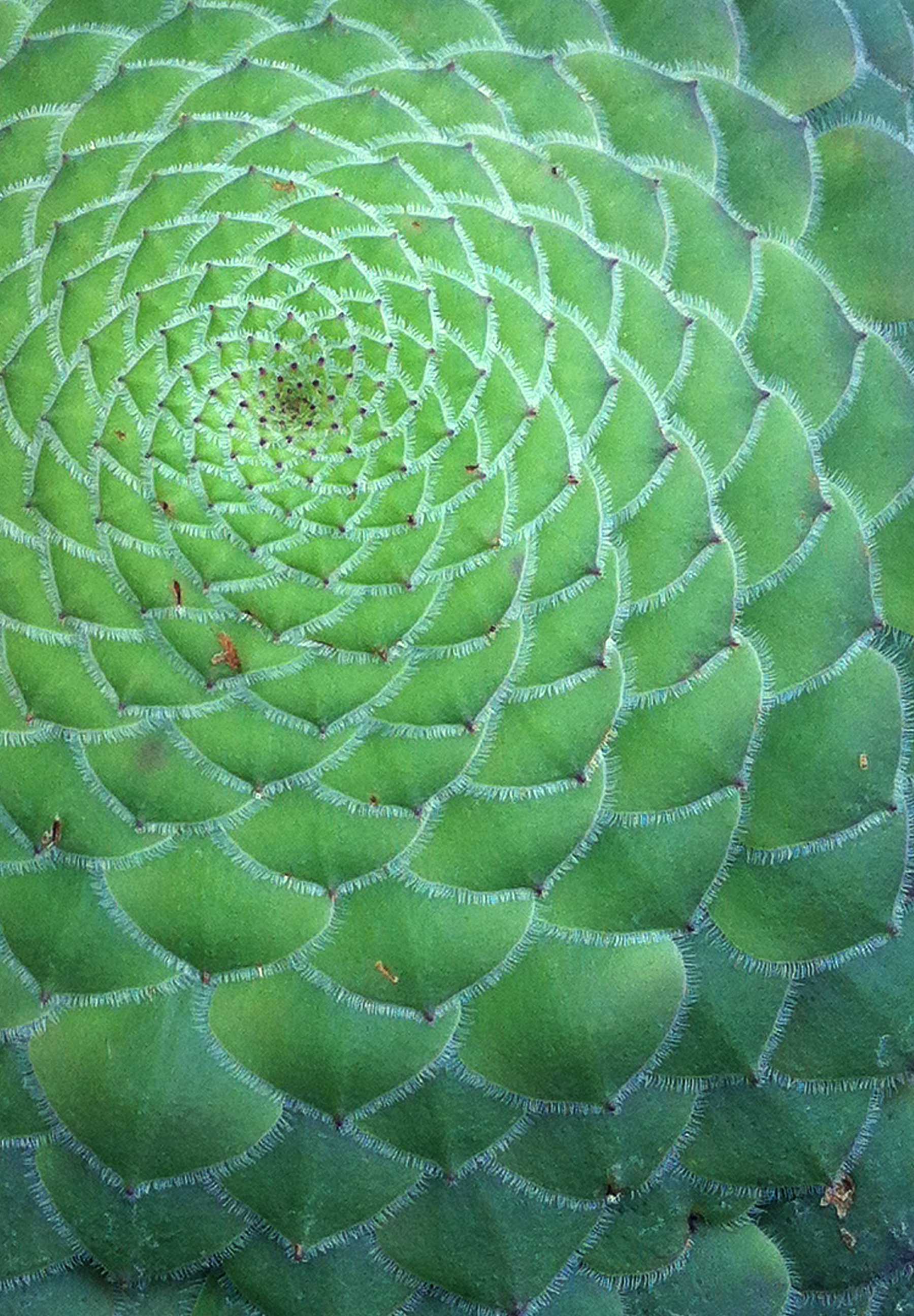
Detail of Aeonium tabuliforme showing the multiple spiral arrangement (parastichy)

Parastichy, in phyllotaxy, is the spiral pattern of particular plant organs on some plants, such as areoles on cacti stems, florets in sunflower heads and scales in pine cones. These spirals involve the insertion of a single primordium.

== See also ==
- Embryology
- Fibonacci number § Nature
- Gerrit van Iterson
- Golden ratio § Nature
- Phyllotaxis
