= Taste aversion =

Taste aversion is associated with:

- Conditioned taste aversion, an acquired aversion to the taste of a food that was paired with aversive stimuli
- Avoidant/restrictive food intake disorder, an eating disorder in which people avoid eating or eat only a very narrow range of foods
