= Chirality =

Difference in shape from a mirror image

Two enantiomers of a generic amino acid that is chiral

Chirality (/kaɪˈrælɪti/) is the property of an object not being identical to its reflection, or mirror image. An object is chiral if it is not identical to its reflection; that is, it cannot be superposed (mapped by rotations and translations alone) onto itself. Conversely, an object is achiral (sometimes also amphichiral) if its reflection cannot be distinguished from the object (i.e. can be superposed onto its reflection), such as a sphere.

A chiral object and its reflection are called enantiomorphs (from Greek for 'opposite forms') or, when referring to molecules, enantiomers. Chirality is a property of asymmetry important in several branches of science.

Human hands are perhaps the most recognized example of chirality. The left hand is a non-superposable mirror image of the right hand; no matter how the two hands are oriented, it is impossible for all the major features of both hands to coincide across all axes. This difference in symmetry becomes obvious if someone attempts to shake the right hand of a person using their left hand, or if a left-handed glove is placed on a right hand.

The word chirality is derived from the Ancient Greek χείρ (kheír), meaning 'hand', a familiar chiral object. The term was first used by Lord Kelvin in 1893 in the second Robert Boyle Lecture at the Oxford University Junior Scientific Club, which was published in 1894:

I call any geometrical figure, or group of points, 'chiral', and say that it has chirality if its image in a plane mirror, ideally realized, cannot be brought to coincide with itself.

== Mathematics ==
An achiral 3D object without central symmetry or a plane of symmetry

A table of all prime knots with seven crossings or fewer (not including mirror images).

In mathematics, a figure is chiral (and said to have chirality) if it cannot be mapped to its mirror image by rotations and translations alone. For example, a right shoe is different from a left shoe, and S-twist yarn is different from Z-twist. See for a full mathematical definition.

A chiral object and its mirror image are said to be enantiomorphs. The word enantiomorph stems from the Greek ἐναντίος (enantios) 'opposite' + μορφή (morphe) 'form'. A non-chiral figure is called achiral or amphichiral.

The helix (and by extension a spun string, a screw, a propeller, etc.) and Möbius strip are chiral two-dimensional objects in three-dimensional ambient space. The J, L, S and Z-shaped tetrominoes of the popular video game Tetris also exhibit chirality, but only in a two-dimensional space.

Many other familiar objects exhibit the same chiral symmetry of the human body, such as gloves, glasses (sometimes), and shoes. A similar notion of chirality is considered in knot theory, as explained below.

Some chiral three-dimensional objects, such as the helix, can be assigned a right or left handedness, according to the right-hand rule.

=== Geometry ===
In geometry, a figure is achiral if and only if its symmetry group contains at least one orientation-reversing isometry. In two dimensions, every figure that possesses an axis of symmetry is achiral, and it can be shown that every bounded achiral figure must have an axis of symmetry. In three dimensions, every figure that possesses a plane of symmetry or a center of symmetry is achiral. There are, however, achiral figures lacking both plane and center of symmetry. In terms of point groups, all chiral figures lack an improper axis of rotation (S_{n}). This means that they cannot contain a center of inversion (i) or a mirror plane (σ). Only figures with a point group designation of C_{1}, C_{n}, D_{n}, T, O, or I can be chiral.

=== Knot theory ===
A knot is called achiral if it can be continuously deformed into its mirror image, otherwise it is called chiral. For example, the unknot and the figure-eight knot are achiral, whereas the trefoil knot is chiral.

== Physics ==
Animation of right-handed (clockwise) circularly polarized light, as defined from the point of view of a receiver in agreement with optics conventions.

In physics, chirality may be found in the spin of a particle, where the handedness of the object is determined by the direction in which the particle spins. Not to be confused with helicity, which is the projection of the spin along the linear momentum of a subatomic particle, chirality is an intrinsic quantum mechanical property, like spin. Although both chirality and helicity can have left-handed or right-handed properties, only in the massless case are they identical. In particular for a massless particle the helicity is the same as the chirality while for an antiparticle they have opposite sign.

The handedness in both chirality and helicity relate to the rotation of a particle while it proceeds in linear motion with reference to the human hands. The thumb of the hand points towards the direction of linear motion whilst the fingers curl into the palm, representing the direction of rotation of the particle (i.e. clockwise and counterclockwise). Depending on the linear and rotational motion, the particle can either be defined by left-handedness or right-handedness. A symmetry transformation between the two is called parity. Invariance under parity by a Dirac fermion is called chiral symmetry.

=== Electromagnetism ===
Electromagnetic waves can have handedness associated with their polarization. Polarization of an electromagnetic wave is the property that describes the orientation, i.e., the time-varying direction and amplitude, of the electric field vector. For example, the electric field vectors of left-handed or right-handed circularly polarized waves form helices of opposite handedness in space.

Circularly polarized waves of opposite handedness propagate through chiral media at different speeds (circular birefringence) and with different losses (circular dichroism). Both phenomena are jointly known as optical activity. Circular birefringence causes rotation of the polarization state of electromagnetic waves in chiral media and can cause a negative index of refraction for waves of one handedness when the effect is sufficiently large.

While optical activity occurs in structures that are chiral in three dimensions (such as helices), the concept of chirality can also be applied in two dimensions. 2D-chiral patterns, such as flat spirals, cannot be superposed with their mirror image by translation or rotation in two-dimensional space (a plane). 2D chirality is associated with directionally asymmetric transmission (reflection and absorption) of circularly polarized waves. 2D-chiral materials, which are also anisotropic and lossy exhibit different total transmission (reflection and absorption) levels for the same circularly polarized wave incident on their front and back. The asymmetric transmission phenomenon arises from different, e.g. left-to-right, circular polarization conversion efficiencies for opposite propagation directions of the incident wave and therefore the effect is referred to as circular conversion dichroism. Like the twist of a 2d-chiral pattern appears reversed for opposite directions of observation, 2d-chiral materials have interchanged properties for left-handed and right-handed circularly polarized waves that are incident on their front and back. In particular left-handed and right-handed circularly polarized waves experience opposite directional transmission (reflection and absorption) asymmetries.

While optical activity is associated with 3d chirality and circular conversion is associated with 2d chirality, both effects have also been observed in structures that are not chiral by themselves. For the observation of these chiral electromagnetic effects, chirality does not have to be an intrinsic property of the material that interacts with the electromagnetic wave. Instead, both effects can also occur when the propagation direction of the electromagnetic wave together with the structure of an (achiral) material form a chiral experimental arrangement. This case, where the mutual arrangement of achiral components forms a chiral (experimental) arrangement, is known as extrinsic chirality.

Chiral mirrors are a class of metamaterials that reflect circularly polarized light of a certain helicity in a handedness-preserving manner, while absorbing circular polarization of the opposite handedness. However, most absorbing chiral mirrors operate only in a narrow frequency band, as limited by the causality principle. Employing a different design methodology that allows undesired waves to pass through instead of absorbing the undesired waveform, chiral mirrors are able to show good broadband performance.

== Chemistry ==
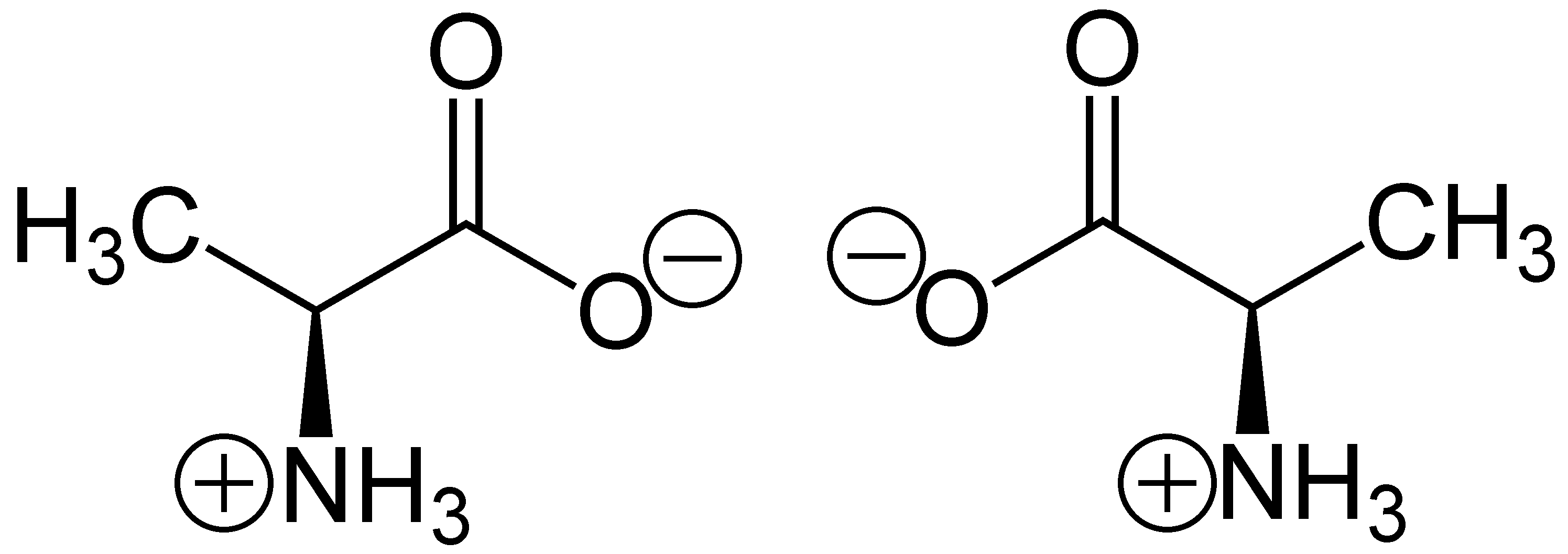
(S)-Alanine (left) and (R)-alanine (right) in zwitterionic form at neutral pH

A chiral molecule is a type of molecule that has a non-superposable mirror image. The feature that is most often the cause of chirality in molecules is the presence of an asymmetric carbon atom.

The term "chiral" in general is used to describe the object that is non-superposable on its mirror image.

In chemistry, chirality usually refers to molecules. Two mirror images of a chiral molecule are called enantiomers or optical isomers. Pairs of enantiomers are often designated as "right-", "left-handed" or, if they have no bias, "achiral". As polarized light passes through a chiral molecule, the plane of polarization, when viewed along the axis toward the source, will be rotated clockwise (to the right) or anticlockwise (to the left). A right handed rotation is dextrorotary (d); that to the left is levorotary (l). The d- and l-isomers are the same compound but are called enantiomers. An equimolar mixture of the two optical isomers, which is called a racemic mixture, will produce no net rotation of polarized light as it passes through. Left handed molecules have l- prefixed to their names; d- is prefixed to right handed molecules. However, this d- and l- notation of distinguishing enantiomers does not say anything about the actual spatial arrangement of the ligands/substituents around the stereogenic center, which is defined as configuration. Another nomenclature system employed to specify configuration is Fischer convention. This is also referred to as the D- and L-system. Here the relative configuration is assigned with reference to D-(+)-Glyceraldehyde and L-(−)-Glyceraldehyde, being taken as standard. Fischer convention is widely used in sugar chemistry and for α-amino acids. Due to the drawbacks of Fischer convention, it is almost entirely replaced by Cahn–Ingold–Prelog convention, also known as the sequence rule or R and S nomenclature. This was further extended to assign absolute configuration to cis-trans isomers with the E-Z notation.

Molecular chirality is of interest because of its application to stereochemistry in inorganic chemistry, organic chemistry, physical chemistry, biochemistry, and supramolecular chemistry.

More recent developments in chiral chemistry include the development of chiral inorganic nanoparticles that may have the similar tetrahedral geometry as chiral centers associated with sp3 carbon atoms traditionally associated with chiral compounds, but at larger scale. Helical and other symmetries of chiral nanomaterials were also obtained.

== Biology ==
R-(+)-Limonene found in all citrus fruits

S-(–)-Limonene found in only trace amounts in lemongrass and citronella

(R)-(−)-Carvone occurs in spearmint and (S)-(+)-carvone occurs in caraway seed oil

Dextropropoxyphene or Darvon, a painkiller

Levopropoxyphene or Novrad, an anticough agent

All of the known life-forms show specific chiral properties in chemical structures as well as macroscopic anatomy, development and behavior. In any specific organism or evolutionarily related set thereof, individual compounds, organs, or behavior are found in the same single enantiomorphic form. Deviation (having the opposite form) could be found in a small number of chemical compounds, or certain organ or behavior but that variation strictly depends upon the genetic make up of the organism. From chemical level (molecular scale), biological systems show extreme stereospecificity in synthesis, uptake, sensing, metabolic processing. A living system usually deals with two enantiomers of the same compound in drastically different ways.

In biology, homochirality is a common property of amino acids and carbohydrates. The chiral protein-making amino acids, which are translated through the ribosome from genetic coding, occur in the L form. However, D-amino acids are also found in nature. The monosaccharides (carbohydrate-units) are commonly found in D-configuration. DNA double helix is chiral (as any kind of helix is chiral), and B-form of DNA shows a right-handed turn.

Sometimes, when two enantiomers of a compound are found in organisms, they significantly differ in their taste, smell and other biological actions. For example,(+)-Carvone is responsible for the smell of caraway seed oil, whereas (–)-carvone is responsible for smell of spearmint oil. However, it is a commonly held misconception that (+)-limonene is found in oranges (causing its smell), and (–)-limonene is found in lemons (causing its smell). In 2021, after rigorous experimentation, it was found that all citrus fruits contain only (+)-limonene and the odor difference is because of other contributing factors.

Also, for artificial compounds, including medicines, in case of chiral drugs, the two enantiomers sometimes show remarkable difference in effect of their biological actions. Dextropropoxyphene (Darvon) is a painkiller, whereas its enantiomer, levopropoxyphene (Novrad) is an anti-cough agent. In case of penicillamine, the (S-isomer is used in the treatment of primary chronic arthritis, whereas the (R)-isomer has no therapeutic effect, as well as being highly toxic. In some cases, the less therapeutically active enantiomer can cause side effects. For example, (S-naproxen is an analgesic but the (R-isomer causes renal problems. In such situations where one of the enantiomers of a racemic drug is active and the other partner has undesirable or toxic effect one may switch from racemate to a single enantiomer drug for a better therapeutic value. Such a switching from a racemic drug to an enantiopure drug is called a chiral switch.

The naturally occurring plant form of alpha-tocopherol (vitamin E) is RRR-α-tocopherol whereas the synthetic form (all-racemic vitamin E, or dl-tocopherol) is equal parts of the stereoisomers RRR, RRS, RSS, SSS, RSR, SRS, SRR, and SSR with progressively decreasing biological equivalency, so that 1.36 mg of dl-tocopherol is considered equivalent to 1.0 mg of d-tocopherol.

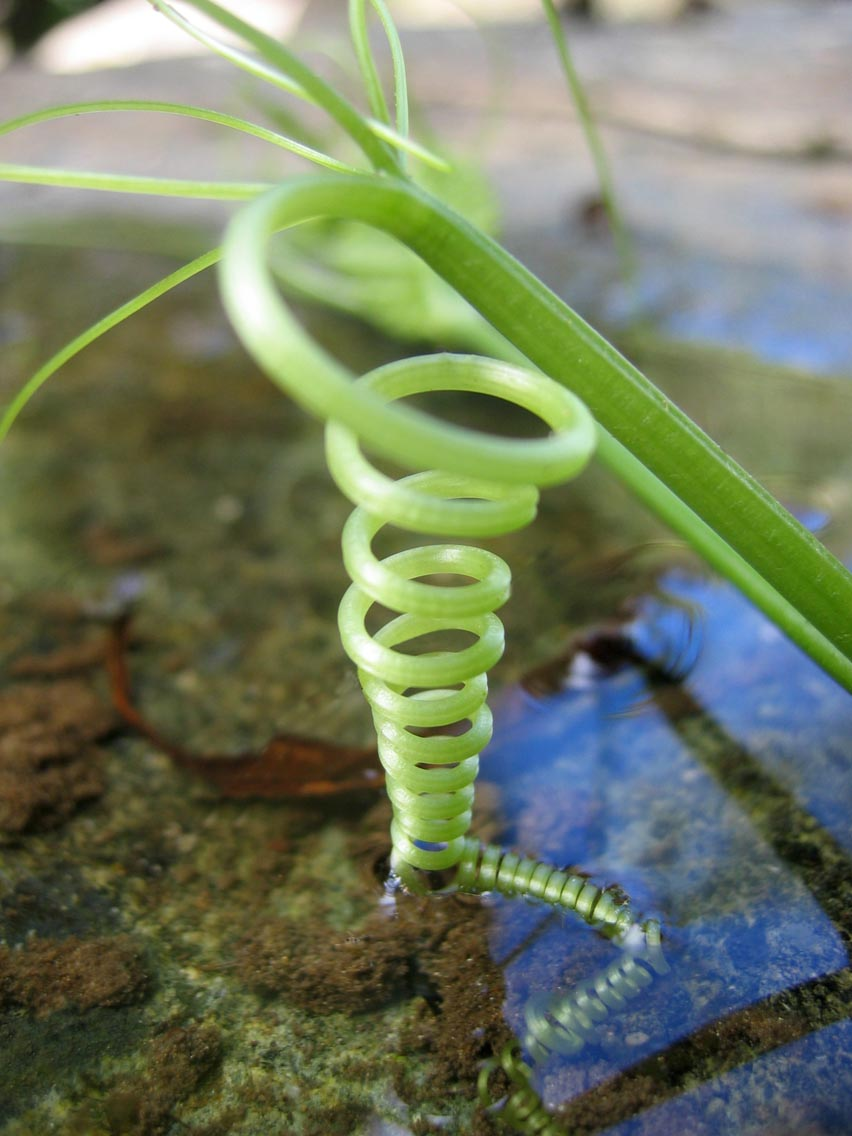
A natural left-handed helix, made by a certain climber plant's tendril

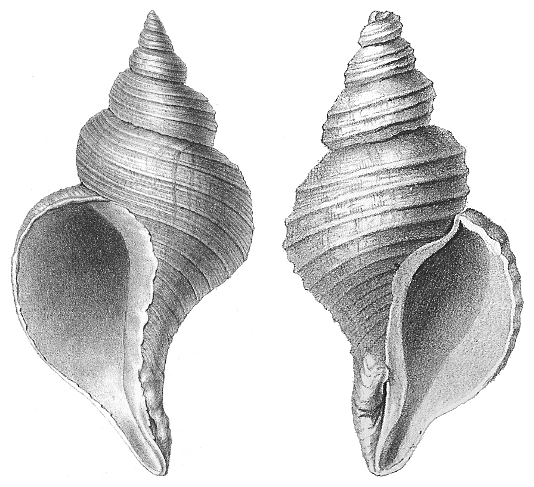
Shells of two different species of sea snail: on the left is the normally sinistral (left-handed) shell of Neptunea angulata, on the right is the normally dextral (right-handed) shell of Neptunea despecta

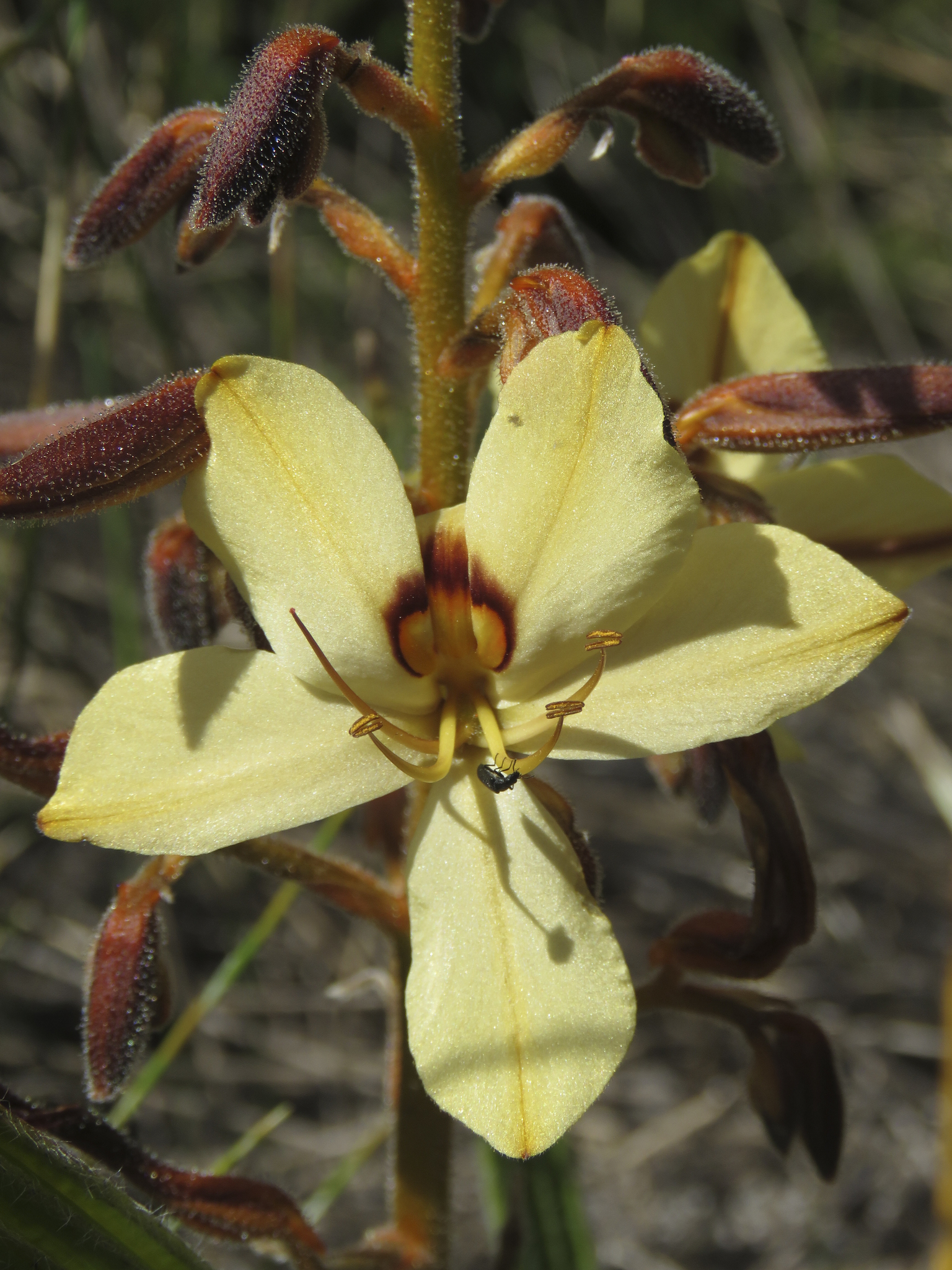
Wachendorfia paniculata flower with style left

Macroscopic examples of chirality are found in the plant kingdom, the animal kingdom and all other groups of organisms. A simple example is the coiling direction of any climber plant, which can grow to form either a left- or right-handed helix.

In anatomy, chirality is found in the imperfect mirror image symmetry of many kinds of animal bodies. Organisms such as gastropods exhibit chirality in their coiled shells, resulting in an asymmetrical appearance. Over 90% of gastropod species have dextral (right-handed) shells in their coiling, but a small minority of species and genera are virtually always sinistral (left-handed). A very few species (for example Amphidromus perversus) show an equal mixture of dextral and sinistral individuals.

In humans, chirality (also referred to as handedness or laterality) is an attribute of humans defined by their unequal distribution of fine motor skill between the left and right hands. An individual who is more dexterous with the right hand is called right-handed, and one who is more skilled with the left is said to be left-handed. Chirality is also seen in the study of facial asymmetry and is known as aurofacial asymmetry.

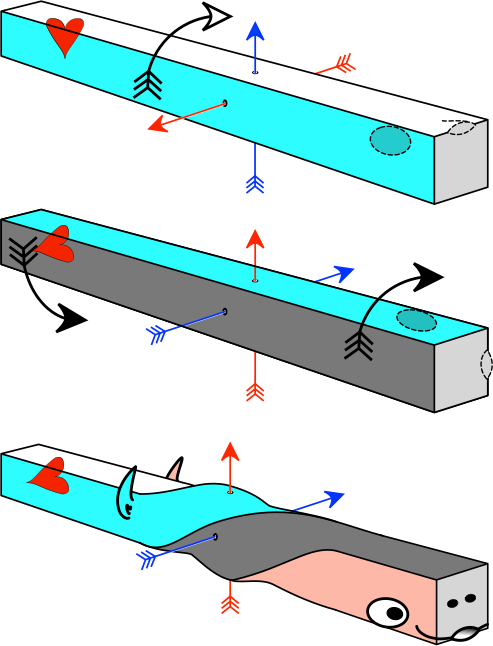
Schema of the development of the axial twist in vertebrates.

According to the Axial Twist theory, vertebrate animals develop into a left-handed chirality. Due to this, the brain is turned around and the heart and bowels are turned by 90°.

In the case of the health condition situs inversus totalis, in which all the internal organs are flipped horizontally (i.e. the heart placed slightly to the right instead of the left), chirality poses some problems should the patient require a liver or heart transplant, as these organs are chiral, thus meaning that the blood vessels which supply these organs would need to be rearranged should a normal, non situs inversus (situs solitus) organ be required.

In the monocot bloodroot family, the species of the genera Wachendorfia and Barberetta have only individuals that either have the style points to the right or the style pointed to the left, with both morphs appearing within the same populations. This is thought to increase outcrossing and so boost genetic diversity, which in turn may help to survive in a changing environment. Remarkably, the related genus Dilatris also has chirally dimorphic flowers, but here both morphs occur on the same plant. In flatfish, the summer flounder or fluke are left-eyed, while halibut are right-eyed.

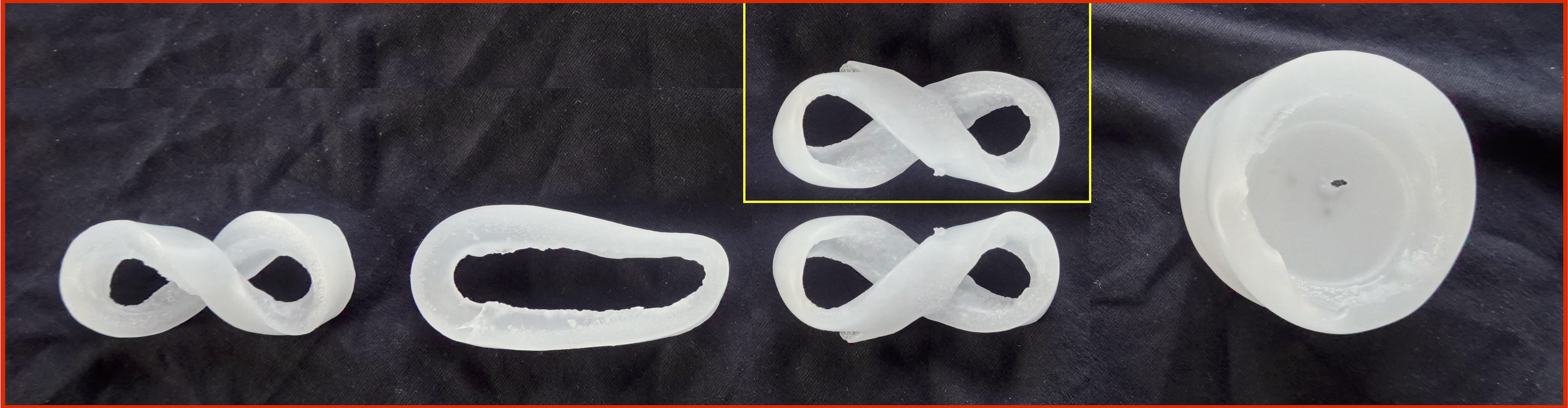
Bodies from twisted soft circles cut off from pillar candle to 8-numbers are said to be achiral since they can be continuously deformed into their mirror image

== Resources and Research ==
=== Journal ===
- Chirality- a scientific journal focused on chirality in chemistry and biochemistry in respect to biological, chemical, materials, pharmacological, spectroscopic and physical properties.

=== Selected Books ===
- Creutz, Michael (2018). From quarks to pions: chiral symmetry and confinement. New Jersey London Singapore Beijing, Shanghai Hong Kong Taipei Chennai Tokyo: World Scientific. ISBN 978-981-322-923-5
- Wolf, Christian (2008). Dynamic stereochemistry of chiral compounds: principles and applications. Cambridge: RSC Publ. ISBN 978-0-85404-246-3
- Beesley, Thomas E.; Scott, Raymond P. W. (1998). Chiral chromatography. Separation science series. Chichester Weinheim: Wiley. ISBN 978-0-471-97427-7

== See also ==
- Handedness
- Chiral drugs
- Chiral switch
- Chiral inversion
- Metachirality
- Orientation (space)
- Sinistral and dextral
- Tendril perversion
- Chirality (physics)
