= Conical spiral =

Plane spiral projected onto the surface of a cone

Conical spiral with an archimedean spiral as floor projection

Floor projection: Fermat's spiral

Floor projection: logarithmic spiral

Floor projection: hyperbolic spiral

In mathematics, a conical spiral, also known as a conical helix, is a space curve on a right circular cone, whose floor projection is a plane spiral. If the floor projection is a logarithmic spiral, it is called conchospiral (from conch).

== Parametric representation ==
In the $x$-$y$-plane a spiral with parametric representation

$$x=r(\varphi)\cos\varphi \ ,\qquad y=r(\varphi)\sin\varphi$$

a third coordinate $z(\varphi)$ can be added such that the space curve lies on the cone with equation $\;m^2(x^2+y^2)=(z-z_0)^2\ ,\ m>0\;$ :

- $x=r(\varphi)\cos\varphi \ ,\qquad y=r(\varphi)\sin\varphi\ , \qquad \color{red}{z=z_0 + mr(\varphi)} \ .$

Such curves are called conical spirals. They were known to Pappos.

Parameter $m$ is the slope of the cone's lines with respect to the $x$-$y$-plane.

A conical spiral can instead be seen as the orthogonal projection of the floor plan spiral onto the cone.

=== Examples ===
1) Starting with an archimedean spiral $\;r(\varphi)=a\varphi\;$ gives the conical spiral (see diagram)
$$x=a\varphi\cos\varphi \ ,\qquad y=a\varphi\sin\varphi\ , \qquad z=z_0 + ma\varphi \ ,\quad \varphi \ge 0 \ .$$
In this case the conical spiral can be seen as the intersection curve of the cone with a helicoid.
2) The second diagram shows a conical spiral with a Fermat's spiral $\;r(\varphi)=\pm a\sqrt{\varphi}\;$ as floor plan.
3) The third example has a logarithmic spiral $\; r(\varphi)=a e^{k\varphi} \;$ as floor plan. Its special feature is its constant slope (see below).
Introducing the abbreviation $K=e^k$gives the description: $r(\varphi)=aK^\varphi$.
4) Example 4 is based on a hyperbolic spiral $\; r(\varphi)=a/\varphi\;$. Such a spiral has an asymptote (black line), which is the floor plan of a hyperbola (purple). The conical spiral approaches the hyperbola for $\varphi \to 0$.

== Properties ==
The following investigation deals with conical spirals of the form $r=a\varphi^n$ and $r=ae^{k\varphi}$, respectively.

=== Slope ===
Slope angle at a point of a conical spiral

The slope at a point of a conical spiral is the slope of this point's tangent with respect to the $x$-$y$-plane. The corresponding angle is its slope angle (see diagram):

$$\tan \beta = \frac{z'}{\sqrt{(x')^2+(y')^2}}=\frac{mr'}{\sqrt{(r')^2+r^2}}\ .$$

A spiral with $r=a\varphi^n$ gives:

- $\tan\beta=\frac{mn}{\sqrt{n^2+\varphi^2}}\ .$

For an archimedean spiral, $n=1$, and hence its slope is$\ \tan\beta=\tfrac{m}{\sqrt{1+\varphi^2}}\ .$

- For a logarithmic spiral with $r=ae^{k\varphi}$ the slope is $\ \tan\beta= \tfrac{mk}{\sqrt{1+k^2}}\$ ($\color{red}{\text{ constant!}}$ ).

Because of this property a conchospiral is called an equiangular conical spiral.

=== Arclength ===
The length of an arc of a conical spiral can be determined by

$$L=\int_{\varphi_1}^{\varphi_2}\sqrt{(x')^2+(y')^2+(z')^2}\,\mathrm{d}\varphi
= \int_{\varphi_1}^{\varphi_2}\sqrt{(1+m^2)(r')^2+r^2}\,\mathrm{d}\varphi \ .$$

For an archimedean spiral the integral can be solved with help of a table of integrals, analogously to the planar case:

$$L= \frac{a}{2} \left[\varphi\sqrt{(1+m^2) + \varphi^2} + (1+m^2)\ln \left(\frac{\varphi + \sqrt{(1+m^2) + \varphi^2}}{\sqrt{1+m^2}}\right)\right ]_{\varphi_1}^{\varphi_2}\ .$$

For a logarithmic spiral the integral can be solved easily:

$$L=\frac{\sqrt{(1+m^2)k^2+1}}{k}(r\big(\varphi_2)-r(\varphi_1)\big)\ .$$

In other cases elliptical integrals occur.

=== Development ===
Development(green) of a conical spiral (red), right: a side view. The plane containing the development is designed by $\pi$. Initially the cone and the plane touch at the purple line.

For the development of a conical spiral the distance $\rho(\varphi)$ of a curve point $(x,y,z)$ to the cone's apex $(0,0,z_0)$ and the relation between the angle $\varphi$ and the corresponding angle $\psi$ of the development have to be determined:

$$\rho=\sqrt{x^2+y^2+(z-z_0)^2}=\sqrt{1+m^2}\;r \ ,$$
$$\varphi= \sqrt{1+m^2}\psi \ .$$

Hence the polar representation of the developed conical spiral is:

- $\rho(\psi)=\sqrt{1+m^2}\; r(\sqrt{1+m^2}\psi)$

In case of $r=a\varphi^n$ the polar representation of the developed curve is

$$\rho=a\sqrt{1+m^2}^{\,n+1}\psi^n,$$

which describes a spiral of the same type.

- If the floor plan of a conical spiral is an archimedean spiral than its development is an archimedean spiral.

In case of a hyperbolic spiral ($n=-1$) the development is congruent to the floor plan spiral.

In case of a logarithmic spiral $r=ae^{k\varphi}$ the development is a logarithmic spiral:

$$\rho=a\sqrt{1+m^2}\;e^{k\sqrt{1+m^2}\psi}\ .$$

=== Tangent trace ===
The trace (purple) of the tangents of a conical spiral with a hyperbolic spiral as floor plan. The black line is the asymptote of the hyperbolic spiral.

The collection of intersection points of the tangents of a conical spiral with the $x$-$y$-plane (plane through the cone's apex) is called its tangent trace.

For the conical spiral

$$(r\cos\varphi, r\sin\varphi,mr)$$

the tangent vector is

$$(r'\cos\varphi-r\sin\varphi,r'\sin\varphi+r\cos\varphi,mr')^T$$

and the tangent:

$$x(t)=r\cos\varphi+t(r'\cos\varphi-r\sin\varphi)\ ,$$
$$y(t)=r\sin\varphi +t(r'\sin\varphi+r\cos\varphi)\ ,$$
$$z(t)=mr+tmr'\ .$$

The intersection point with the $x$-$y$-plane has parameter $t=-r/r'$ and the intersection point is

- $\left( \frac{r^2}{r'}\sin\varphi, -\frac{r^2}{r'}\cos\varphi,0 \right)\ .$

$r=a\varphi^n$ gives $\ \tfrac{r^2}{r'}=\tfrac{a}{n}\varphi^{n+1}\$ and the tangent trace is a spiral. In the case $n=-1$ (hyperbolic spiral) the tangent trace degenerates to a circle with radius $a$ (see diagram). For $r=a e^{k\varphi}$ one has $\ \tfrac{r^2}{r'}=\tfrac{r}{k}\$ and the tangent trace is a logarithmic spiral, which is congruent to the floor plan, because of the self-similarity of a logarithmic spiral.

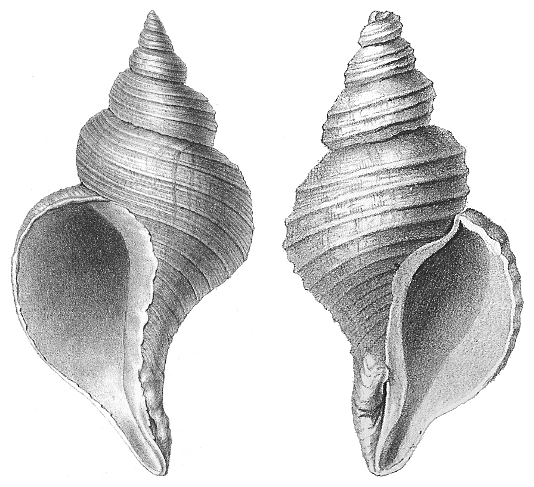
Snail shells (Neptunea angulata left, right: Neptunea despecta
