= Vexillum chocotinctum =

Scientific classification
- Kingdom: Animalia
- Phylum: Mollusca
- Class: Gastropoda
- Subclass: Caenogastropoda
- Order: Neogastropoda
- Family: Costellariidae
- Genus: Vexillum
- Species: V. chocotinctum

Binomial name
- Vexillum chocotinctum Turner, 2008

Synonyms
- Vexillum (Pusia) chocotinctum Turner, 2008

Species of gastropod

Vexillum chocotinctum is a species of small sea snail, marine gastropod mollusk in the family Costellariidae, the ribbed miters.

== Description ==
The length of the shell attains 25.4 mm. It has a dextrally coiled shell, a body length of 18.4mm, and has lens eyes. It moves via mucus mediated gliding, hunts for its food, and reproduces sexually.

== Distribution ==
This marine species occurs off Vietnam and Papua New Guinea.
