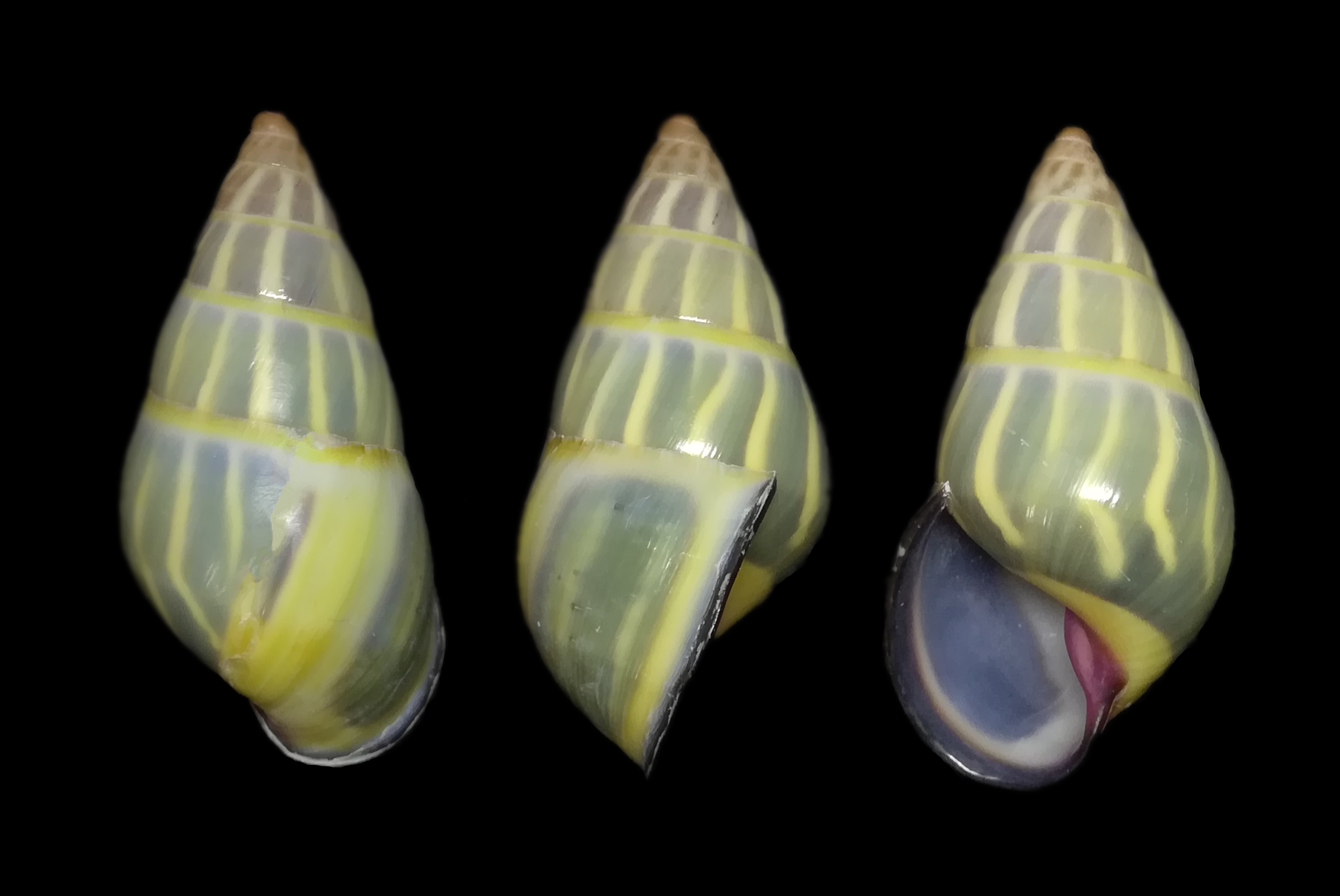

Scientific classification
- Kingdom: Animalia
- Phylum: Mollusca
- Class: Gastropoda
- Order: Stylommatophora
- Family: Camaenidae
- Genus: Amphidromus
- Species: A. anhdaoorum

Binomial name
- Amphidromus anhdaoorum Thach, 2017

= Amphidromus anhdaoorum =

Species of medium-sized air-breathing tree snail

Amphidromus anhdaoorum is a species of medium-sized air-breathing tree snail, an arboreal gastropod mollusk in the family Camaenidae.

== Morphology ==
Medium-sized sinistral shell with black outer lip, yellow spiral band at base and red stripe around the umbilicus.

== Distribution ==
Đắk Lắk Province, Central Vietnam.

== Habitat ==
Around trees.

== Etymology ==
This species is named after Phạm Ngọc Anh and Lê Thị Hồng Đào who provided the type material.
