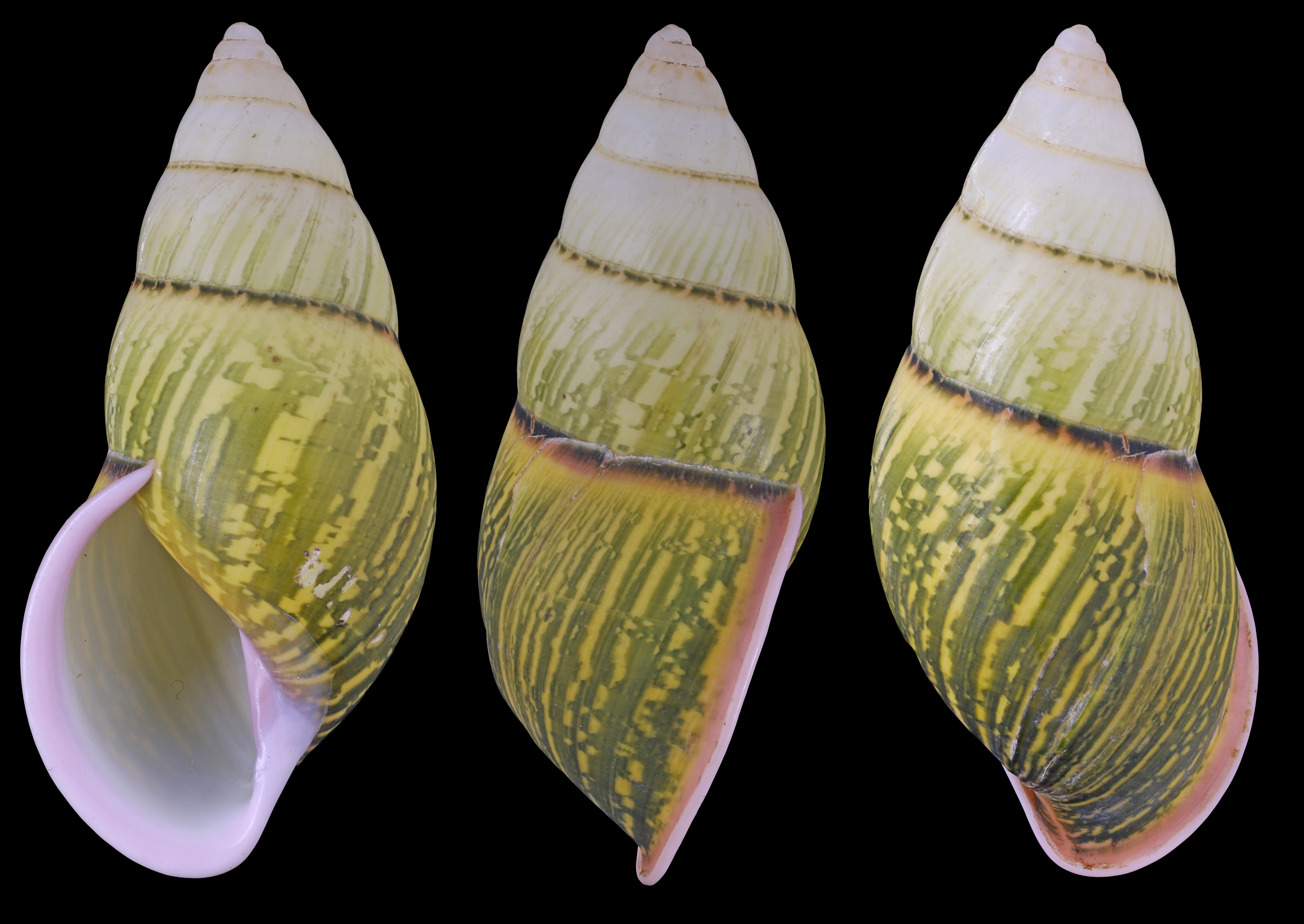
- Shell of Amphidromus dungae (holotype at the MNHN, Paris)

Scientific classification
- Kingdom: Animalia
- Phylum: Mollusca
- Class: Gastropoda
- Order: Stylommatophora
- Family: Camaenidae
- Genus: Amphidromus
- Species: A. dungae

Binomial name
- Amphidromus dungae Thach, 2021

= Amphidromus dungae =

Species of tree snail

Amphidromus dungae is a species of air-breathing tree snail, an arboreal gastropod mollusk in the family Camaenidae.

== Description ==
The length of this sinistral shell attains 42 mm.

== Distribution ==
This species is endemic to Vietnam.
