= Partulina terebra fusoidea =

Conservation status
- Data Deficient (IUCN 2.3)

- Critically Imperiled (NatureServe)

Scientific classification
- Kingdom: Animalia
- Phylum: Mollusca
- Class: Gastropoda
- Order: Stylommatophora
- Family: Achatinellidae
- Genus: Partulina
- Species: P. terebra
- Subspecies: P. t. fusoidea

Trinomial name
- Partulina terebra fusoidea (Newcomb, 1855)

Synonyms
- Achatinella fusoidea Newcomb, 1855 superseded combination; Partulina (Partulina) fusoidea (Newcomb, 1855) alternative representation; Partulina (Partulina) terebra fusoidea (Newcomb, 1855) alternative representation; Partulina fusoidea (Newcomb, 1855) superseded rank

Species of gastropod

Partulina terebra fusoidea is a species of tropical air-breathing land snail, a terrestrial pulmonate gastropod mollusk in the family Achatinellidae.

== Distribution ==
This species is endemic to Hawaii, in the United States.

== Description ==
Partulina terebra fusoidea are small snails, with a shell that is 8 mm wide and 17 mm long. Their shells are dextral and have 6–7 whorls. Their shells are dark brown colored with a caramel-like brown swirl, while their foot is of a light-greenish yellow color.

== Distribution ==
Partulina terebra fusoidea is endemic to Maui, specifically Ukumehame West Maui.
