= Conchospiral =

Logarithmic spiral projected onto the surface of a cone

An example

In mathematics, a conchospiral a specific type of space spiral on the surface of a cone (a conical spiral), whose floor projection is a logarithmic spiral. Conchospirals are used in biology for modelling snail shells, and flight paths of insects and in electrical engineering for the construction of antennas.

== Parameterization ==
In cylindrical coordinates, the conchospiral is described by the parametric equations:

$$r=\mu^t a$$
$$\theta=t$$
$$z=\mu^t c.$$

The projection of a conchospiral on the $(r,\theta)$ plane is a logarithmic spiral. The parameter $\mu$ controls the opening angle of the projected spiral, while the parameter $c$ controls the slope of the cone on which the curve lies.

== History ==
The name "conchospiral" was given to these curves by 19th-century German mineralogist Georg Amadeus Carl Friedrich Naumann, in his study of the shapes of sea shells.

== Applications ==
The conchospiral has been used in the design for radio antennas. In this application, it has the advantage of producing a radio beam in a single direction, towards the apex of the cone.
