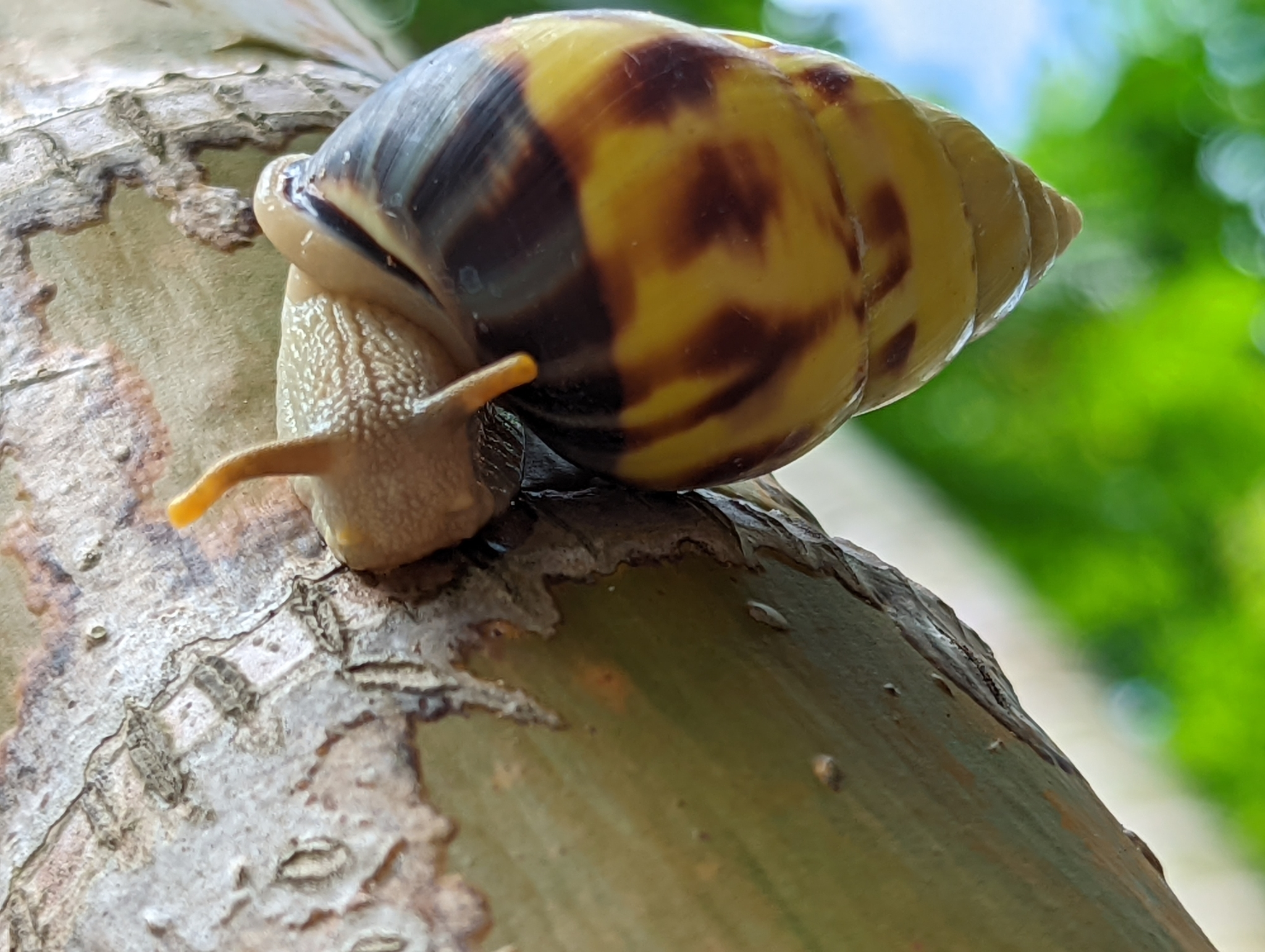

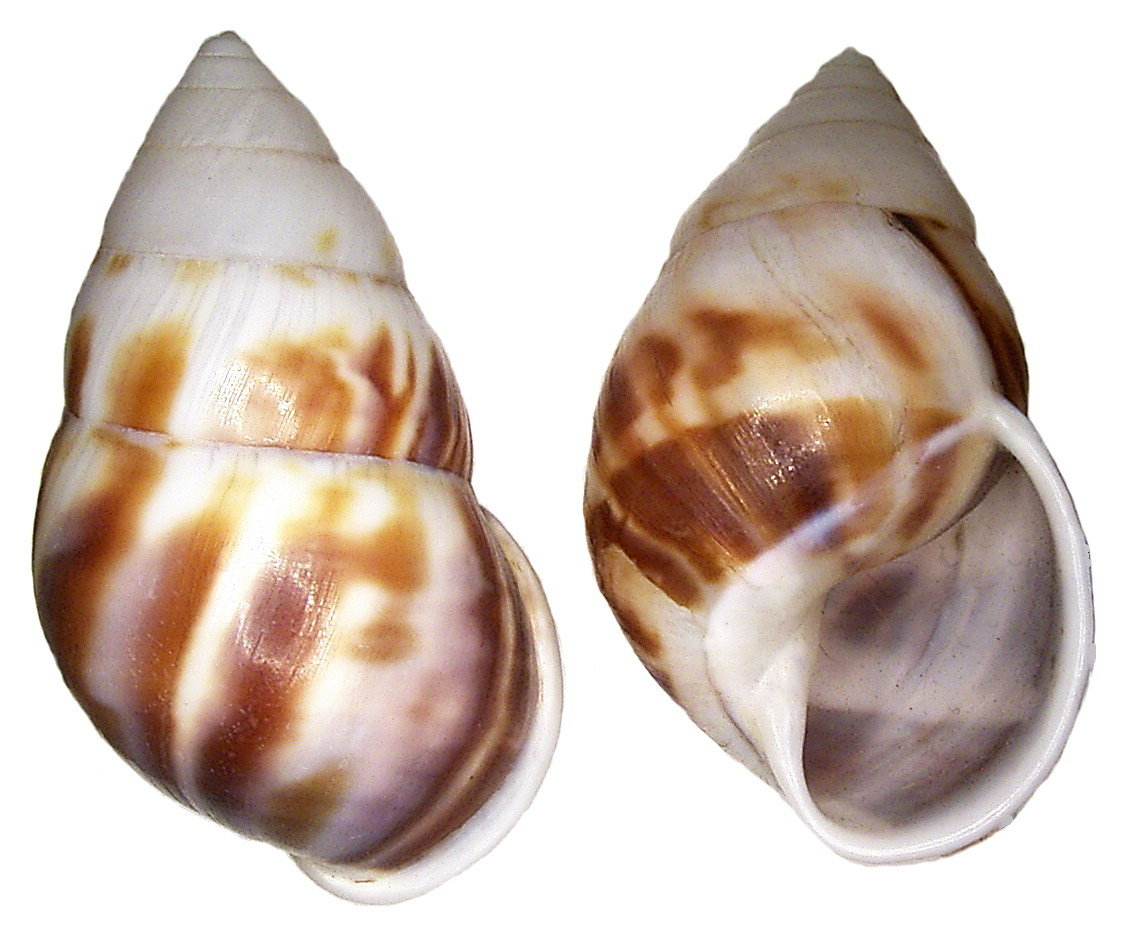
- Abapertural and apertural view of the shell of Amphidromus perversus

Scientific classification
- Kingdom: Animalia
- Phylum: Mollusca
- Class: Gastropoda
- Order: Stylommatophora
- Family: Camaenidae
- Genus: Amphidromus
- Species: A. perversus

Binomial name
- Amphidromus perversus (Linnaeus, 1758)

Synonyms
- Amphidromus (Amphidromus) perversus (Linnaeus, 1758)· accepted, alternate representation; Amphidromus aureus (Dillwyn, 1817) (junior synonym); Amphidromus interruptus (O. F. Müller, 1774) superseded combination; Amphidromus perversus rufocinctus Fruhstorfer, 1905 junior homonym (invalid: not Fulton, 1896); Amphidromus perversus var. aureus (Dillwyn, 1817); Amphidromus perversus var. interruptus (O. F. Müller, 1774) junior subjective synonym; Amphidromus perversus var. interruptus f. sultana Lamarck, 1822 junior subjective synonym; Bulimus perversus (Linnaeus, 1758) superseded combination; Bulimus sultanus Lamarck, 1822 junior subjective synonym; Helix aurea Dillwyn, 1817 (basionym); Helix interrupta O. F. Müller, 1774 junior subjective synonym; Helix perversa Linnaeus, 1758 (original combination)

= Amphidromus perversus =

Species of gastropod

Amphidromus perversus is a species of air-breathing land snail, a terrestrial pulmonate gastropod mollusc in the family Camaenidae.

Amphidromus perversus is the type species of the genus Amphidromus, by the subsequent designation of Eduard von Martens (1860).

== Subspecies ==
- Amphidromus perversus butoti Laidlaw & Solem, 1961
- Amphidromus perversus kadatuaensis Dharma, 2007
- Amphidromus perversus emaciatus (von Martens, 1867) (uncertain > taxon inquirendum, based on invalid original name; no replacement name has been proposed)
- Amphidromus perversus natunensis Fulton, 1896
- Amphidromus perversus perversus (Linnaeus, 1758)
- Amphidromus perversus siglerae Thach, 2018

Synonyms

- Amphidromus perversus melanomma (Pfeiffer, 1852): synonym of Amphidromus melanomma (L. Pfeiffer, 1852)
- Amphidromus perversus rufocinctus Fruhstorfer, 1905: synonym of Amphidromus perversus (Linnaeus, 1758) (junior homonym, invalid: not Fulton, 1896)

== Distribution ==
Distribution of Amphidromus perversus include Sumatra and Java to Borneo, Sulawesi and Bali.

Absent from the Mentawi Chain and Panaitan Island. Its occurrence on Sumbawa needs confirmation. Probably it has been introduced into Singapore. Subspecies recognized here are from Great Natuna, Bawean, Kangean Islands and Riau Islands.

== Shell description ==
Amphidromus perversus are amphidromine (left-handed and right-handed snails occur in the population).

In Amphidromus perversus and most other thick-shelled Amphidromus species, the lip is internally thickened, forms a "roll" in its expansion, and has a very heavy parietal callus.

The shell is solid, polished, amphidromine, moderately large (45–55 mm) high, usually with a dark varix. Lip and callus white; ground color white, orange, yellow, or yellowish-green. Many specimens with interrupted or continuous radial brownish streaks covering part or all of the whorls on the lower spire and body whorl.

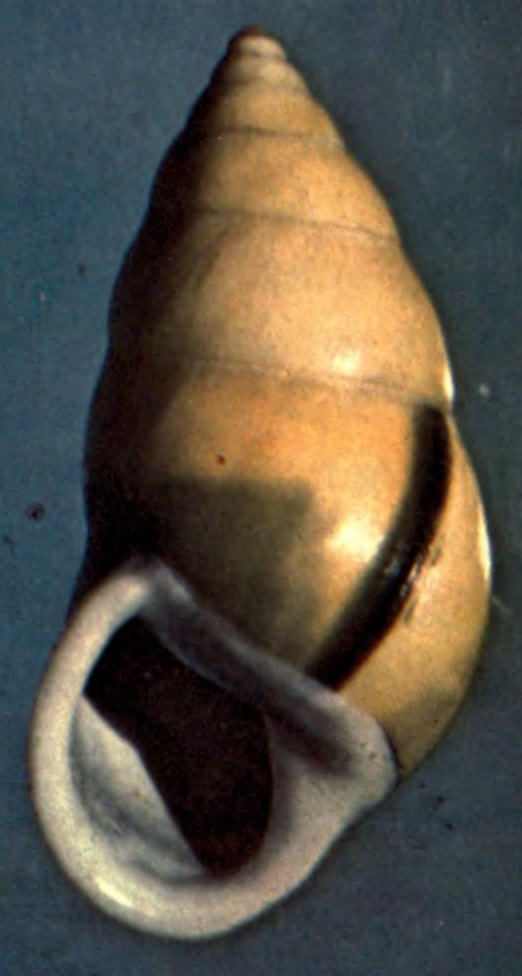
apertural view of the shell of paratype of Amphidromus perversus butoti showing infraviridis color pattern.

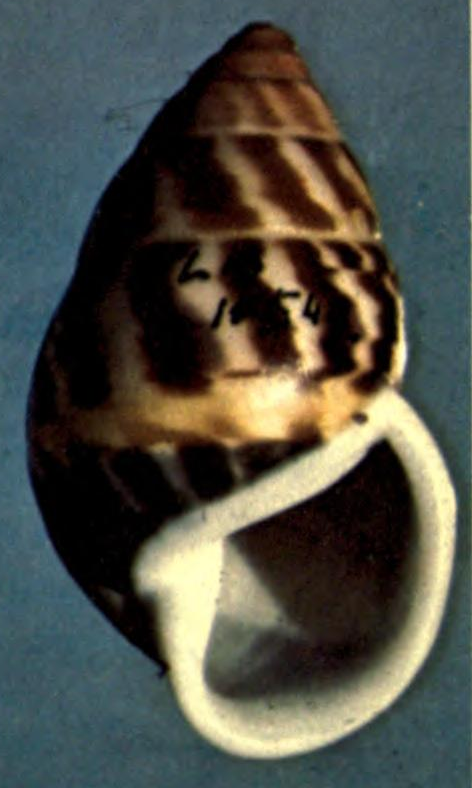
apertural view of the shell of paratype of Amphidromus perversus butoti showing sultanus color pattern.

Amphidromus perversus undoubtedly offers the greatest array of discretely variable color combinations of any species of Amphidromus.

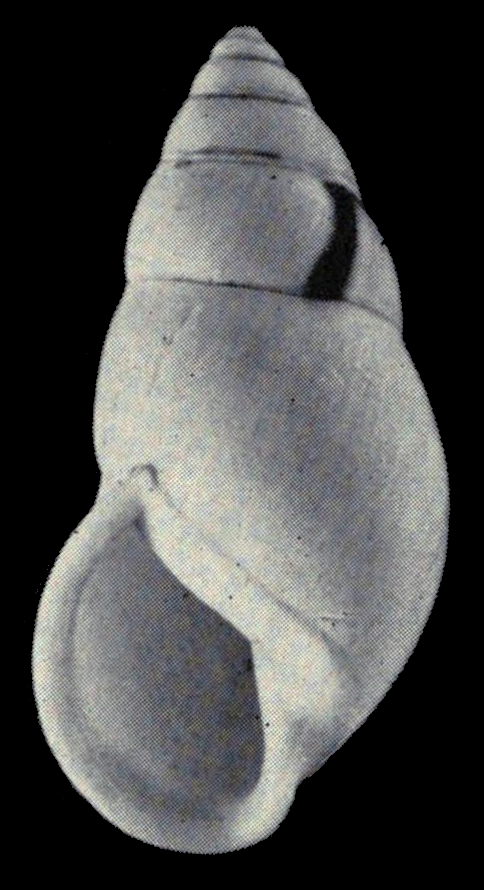
Amphidromus perversus perversus f. niveus

Color variation of Amphidromus perversus perversus include 12 forms:

- Amphidromus perversus perversus f. aurea Dillwyn, 1817 (not Martyn, 1784), is usable for the orange-colored (instead of yellow) monochrome shells found on Java and Celebes. Apparently an individual variation.
- Amphidromus perversus perversus f. aureus Martyn, 1784 — It still have not been reported from a precise locality. It was based on three shells collected by Sir Joseph Banks, supposedly on Pulau Panaitan. The only Amphidromus found there, Amphidromus banksi Butot, is quite different and the actual locahty of aureus is still unknown. The shells have a wide, white zone below the suture as in the Amphidromus atricallosus complex and the lower parts of the whorls are yellow, with or without narrow, wavy, reddish-brown flammulations. The original specimens in the Natural History Museum appear to be a form of Amphidromus perversus, but the locality remains a mystery. Note: Martyn's work was invalidated by action of the International Commission on Zoological Nomenclature, varietal names are not accorded legal status and the use of aureus is as a convenient term of reference.
- Amphidromus perversus perversus f. borneensis Pilsbry, 1900, is based on a stout variant of the interruptus pattern, whitish in background color, and rather similar to the Javanese subspecies, emaciatus. It was described from South Borneo in the Bandjermassin District (Chicago Natural History Museum 63377), but there are specimens in the Naturalis, Leiden from East Borneo. The flammulations above the periphery are reduced in number. Possibly this may prove to be a subspecies, but not enough data are available.
- Amphidromus perversus perversus f. infrapictus von Martens, 1867, was considered by Pilsbry (1900) to be identical with interruptus Müller, 1774. At best it might be considered a slightly different stage in an almost continuous series of variations.
- Amphidromus perversus perversus f. infraviridis von Martens, 1867, probably is a derivative of the Celebesian infrapictus. Instead of flammulations and a basal purplish zone it has a pale green or greenish-yellow base which is only slightly darker than the greenish-yellow or citron-colored spire. It is most similar to typical perversus but differs in the darker basal portion.
- Amphidromus perversus perversus f. interruptus Müller, 1774, has a purplish or brownish zone on the base, a yellow or whitish patch near the columella, and brownish flammulations that are somewhat interrupted on the periphery and do not reach the suture above.
- Amphidromus perversus perversus f. mitra von Martens, 1867, is an unfigured variety from Bali and seems to be intermediate between interruptus and sultanus.

(Described as Amphidromus mitra) The shell is short and of a conic figure, exhibiting a beautiful golden yellow base color with broad reddish-chestnut brown stripes that rarely extend onto the upper portion of the last whorl. A more intense golden yellow band is present, though it is not sharply defined at the edges.

- Amphidromus perversus perversus f. niveus P. & F. Sarasin, 1899 is snow-white with a black varix and black mark behind the peristome. It is an "albino" perversus which is common in the Celebes and sporadically seen from Java and Borneo.
- Amphidromus perversus perversus f. obesus von Martens, 1867, is an unfigured variety which probably can be equated with squat individuals of the typical perversus pattern.
- Amphidromus perversus perversus f. perversus Linnaeus, 1758, is a solid yellow shell with black varix and narrow black band behind the peristome. It is known from the whole range of the species.
- Amphidromus perversus perversus f. strigosus von Martens, 1867, has continuous, rather narrow, straight brown bands running from the suture to the bottom of the whorl. It is known from Bali, Borneo, and Celebes.
- Amphidromus perversus perversus f. sultanus Lamarck, 1822, has wavy brown bands running over the entire whorl. The bands are interrupted in the middle of the whorl by a narrow spiral band of the ground color. This variation is found in all parts of the species range.

== Amphidromus perversus butoti ==
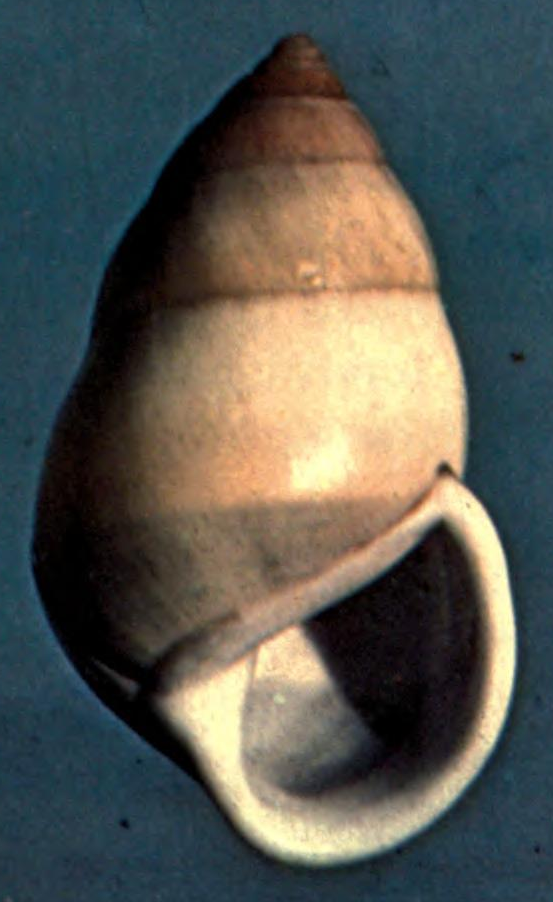
apertural view of the shell of holotype of Amphidromus perversus butoti

Holotype: Zoological Museum in Amsterdam. The type locality is Bajutan, Kangean Islands. Collected by Hoogerwerf on August 20, 1954.

Description: A brilliantly colored series of populations with highly polished shell surface. The general intensity of the coloration and the strong polish are the only features separating this race from the other subspecies.

Remarks: The problem of how to treat insular populations which show minor divergence from the main stocks is far from being satisfactorily settled. The intense coloration of the Kangean populations shows a minor difference from the main populations and Laidlaw & Solem (1961) have recognized it with a subspecific name. For purposes of future reference, they selected as holotype a shell with a color pattern quite distinct from any which have been named. Thus, the name butoti can at least be used for the color variation if it is decided to include the Kangean populations in the nominate form of perversus. Besides the nominate color pattern of butoti, shells referable to the infraviridis, infrapictus, rufocinctus, sultanus and typical perversus pattern were seen on Kangean Island.

Paratypes: Specimens were seen from several localities on Kangean Island. The shells from Sepandjang are in Chicago Natural History Museum, no. 97808, in the Zoological Museum in Amsterdam, and in Butot; Djukung specimens are in the Zoological Museum in Amsterdam; and topotypes from Bajutan are in Chicago Natural History Museum, no. 97806, and in Butot and the Zoologisch Museum, Amsterdam, Some additional material from Kangean Island (USNM 468416, Paravicini!) was seen after the description had been written.

== Amphidromus perversus emaciatus ==
Range: Central and East Java, possibly Bali.

Remarks: The shell is white with rather numerous brown flammulations that become confluent on the base, elongate, and quite slender. Apparently it is a white derivative from the interruptus stock, which may have a definite geographic separation in Bali and Java. Material from Kedewan, East Java (Butot, Chicago Natural History Museum 72404) ranged from 43.5 to 48 mm in height.

The shell can be either dextral or sinistral, perforate or closed, and conic to oblong, exhibiting striatulations but little shine. Its color is pale sulfur (or white), featuring longitudinal brown streaks that appear more sparse and paler above but closer and darker on the base, and are not interrupted by a peripheral light girdle; it also has one or two black varices. Comprising six and a half but little convex whorls, the shell possesses an aperture that is less than half the shell's length and whitish within. The peristome is white, reflexed, and recurved, generally with a dark brown edge that is usually in large part adnate. The columella is vertical and straight; the parietal callus is white or shows the stripes through it.

== Amphidromus perversus melanomma ==
Range: Riau Archipelago near Singapore and possibly Perak and Biliton Island off Borneo.

(Described as Amphidromus melanomma) The shell can be either sinistral or dextral, imperforate, and oblong-ovate, appearing solid and strong, and exhibiting striatulations. Its color is whitish (sometimes rose or cream-tinted), featuring crowded chestnut streaks that are often irregular or ragged, and typically interrupted by a yellow peripheral girdle, although this girdle is frequently absent. The streaks may be either continuous from the suture to the base or weak below the suture, sometimes leaving a white columellar patch. One or two blackish varices are generally present; the upper whorls are not streaked but appear white or brown-banded; the apex is deep purple, rarely white. Comprising six and a half whorls, the body whorl is more or less concave below the suture. The aperture is oblique and white within; the peristome is white, reflexed, and recurved, but usually not adnate behind, with a white edge. The columella is vertical and thick, its reflexed edge generally covering the axial chink; the parietal callus is strong and white, deeply entering, and often dark within.

Remarks: The purple apex, the numerous wavy brown flammulations that are partially interrupted by a yellow peripheral color band, and the solid shell are characteristic. This variety is similar to sultanus, but has only partial interruption of the stripes by the color band and has the purple apex. The Biliton record from the early Samarang voyage is questionable, and it is quite possible that the Perak records of De Morgan are in error. The only certain localities are the Singapore area and Riau Archipelago.

== Amphidromus perversus natunensis ==
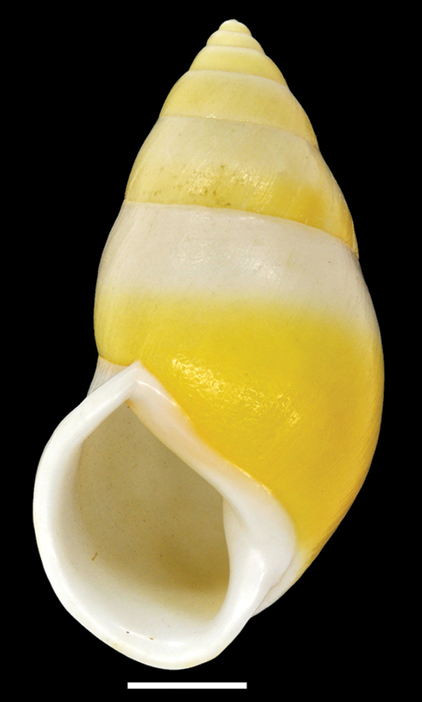
Amphidromus perversus natunensis

Range: Great Natuna Islands; possibly the South Natuna and Anamba Islands also.

The yellow peripheral band of melanomma is absent; otherwise this is close to the Riau population. Amphidromus perversus natunensis is quite variable in color, ranging from white to dark (see Pilsbry 1900, pp. 162–163). Possibly some of the material that Jacobi (1895) dissected under the names Amphidromus interruptus and Amphidromus chloris belongs here, but the shells were not figured and their location is unknown. The South Natuna Island record needs confirmation, while specimens from Siantan, Anamba Islands (CNHM 72427), are referred by Laidlaw & Solem (1961) with some hesitation.

== Amphidromus perversus rufocinctus ==
Range: Bawean Island, Java.

This weakly characterized race differs primarily by its intense color, strong color zone, and slight white margin at the suture. Of seventeen shells collected in May, 1954, by Hoogerwerf at Telaga Kastoba, Bawean Island, ten were dextral and seven sinistral. Three lacked a varix, one was grass green in color, three were whitish, and thirteen had yellow ground color. The name sankapurus Fruhstorfer, 1905, refers to white shells with a very dark color band. This variation is similar to Amphidromus perversus butoti.
