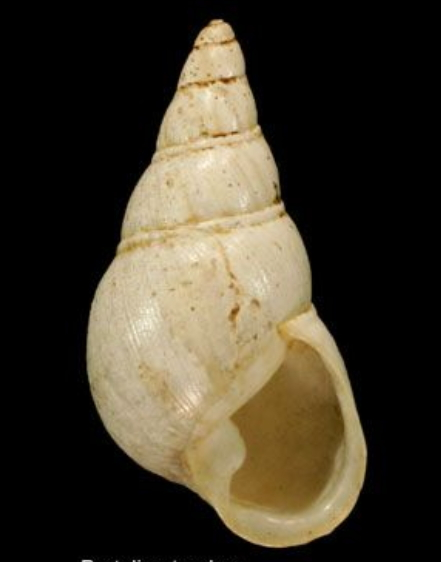
- Shell of Partulina terebra (specimen at the Natural History Museum, Rotterdam)

Conservation status
- Data Deficient (IUCN 2.3)

- Critically Imperiled (NatureServe)

Scientific classification
- Kingdom: Animalia
- Phylum: Mollusca
- Class: Gastropoda
- Order: Stylommatophora
- Family: Achatinellidae
- Genus: Partulina
- Species: P. terebra

Binomial name
- Partulina terebra (Newcomb, 1854)

Synonyms
- Achatinella terebra Newcomb, 1854; Partulina (Partulina) terebra (Newcomb, 1854); Achatinella corusca Pilsbry & Cooke, 1912

= Partulina terebra =

Species of gastropod

Partulina terebra is a species of land snail in the family Achatinellidae.

Subspecies

- Partulina terebra attenuata (L. Pfeiffer, 1855)
- Partulina terebra fusoidea (Newcomb, 1855)
- Partulina terebra terebra (Newcomb, 1854)
- Partulina terebra winniei D. D. Baldwin, 1908

== Description ==
The length of the shell attains 18 mm.

(Original description) The shell is turreted and consists of six rounded whorls. The body whorl is notably inflated and distinctly margined along its upper edge. The suture is well-impressed, creating a clear definition between the segments. The aperture is shaped in an elongate-ovate fashion, leading to a outer lip that is slightly reflected and thickened within. The short columella terminates in a prominent, twisted plait that serves as a defining feature of the aperture.

The surface is textured with decussating striae, creating a fine, cross-hatched pattern. The shell is a light yellow, adorned with wave-like, brown markings that become nearly obsolete as they reach the upper whorls. In contrast to the patterned exterior, the lip, the columella, and the interior of the aperture are all a pristine white.

== Distribution ==
This species is endemic to Hawaii in the United States.
