= Metachirality =

Metachirality is a stronger form of chirality. It applies to objects or systems that are chiral (not identical to their mirror image) and where, in addition, their mirror image has a symmetry group that differs from the symmetry group of the original object or system.

Many familiar chiral objects, like the capital letter 'Z' embedded in the plane, are not metachiral. The symmetry group of the capital letter 'Z' embedded in the plane consists of the identity transformation and a rotation over 180˚ (a half turn). In this case, the mirror image has the same symmetry group. In particular, asymmetric objects (that only have the identity transformation as symmetry, like a human hand) are not metachiral, since the mirror image is also asymmetric. In general, two-dimensional objects and bounded three-dimensional objects are not metachiral.

An example of a metachiral object is an infinite helical staircase. A helix in 3D has a handedness (either left or right, like screw thread), whereby it differs from its mirror image. An infinite helical staircase, however, does have symmetries: screw operations, that is, a combination of a translation and a rotation. The symmetry group of the mirror image of an infinite helical staircase also contains screw operations. But they are of the opposite handedness and, hence, the symmetry groups differ. Note, however, that these symmetry groups are isomorphic.

Of the 219 space groups, 11 are metachiral. A nice example of a metachiral spatial structure is the K_{4} crystal, also known as Triamond, and featured in the Bamboozle mathematical artwork.

== See also ==
- Orientation (mathematics)
- Stereochemistry
- Right-hand rule
- Handedness
- Asymmetry
