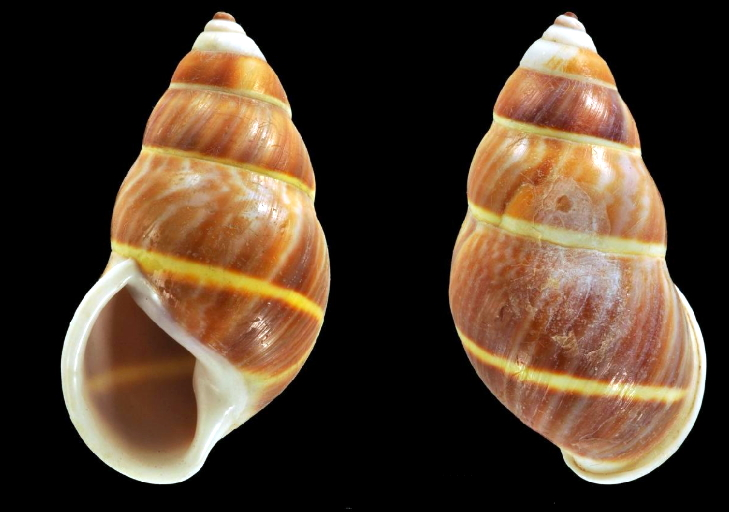
- Shell of Amphidromus melanomma (possible syntype at the MNHUK, London)

Scientific classification
- Kingdom: Animalia
- Phylum: Mollusca
- Class: Gastropoda
- Order: Stylommatophora
- Family: Camaenidae
- Genus: Amphidromus
- Species: A. melanomma

Binomial name
- Amphidromus melanomma (L. Pfeiffer, 1852)

Synonyms
- Amphidromus perversus melanomma (L. Pfeiffer, 1852); Bulimus melanomma L. Pfeiffer, 1852 (original combination)

= Amphidromus melanomma =

Species of tree snail

Amphidromus melanomma is a species of air-breathing tree snail, an arboreal gastropod mollusk in the family Camaenidae.

== Description ==
The length of the shell attains 47.8 mm, its diameter 26.3 mm.

(Original description in Latin) The shell is sinistral, imperforate, and ovate-oblong. It exhibits a solid and thick structure. Its surface appears irregularly finely striated and somewhat dull, displaying a pink or tawny base color. It is ornamented with close-set wavy broad chestnut streaks and four upwardly whitening lemon-yellow bands. The spire presents a convex-conical shape with a somewhat acute, black apex. It contains seven somewhat convex whorls. It shows a slight excavation below the suture. The body whorl is scarcely shorter than the spire and is rounded at the base. The columella is thick and white, scarcely twisted above. The aperture lies obliquely and has a semi-oval form, appearing white inside. The peristome is thick, white, and expanded-reflected, with its margins joined by a thick, long-extending callus.

== Distribution ==
This species is endemic to the Moluccas, Indonesia and in Malaysia
