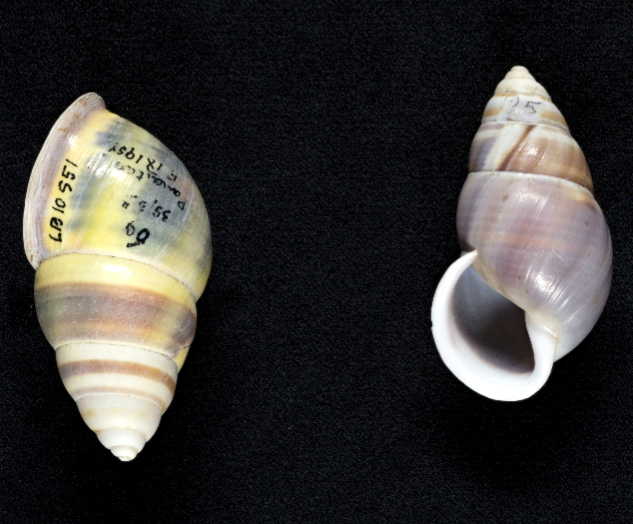
- Shell of Amphidromus banksi (specimen at the Biologiezentrum Linz, Austria)

Scientific classification
- Kingdom: Animalia
- Phylum: Mollusca
- Class: Gastropoda
- Order: Stylommatophora
- Family: Camaenidae
- Genus: Amphidromus
- Species: A. banksi

Binomial name
- Amphidromus banksi Butot, 1955

= Amphidromus banksi =

Species of tree snail

Amphidromus banksi is a species of air-breathing tree snail, an arboreal gastropod mollusk in the family Camaenidae.

== Description ==
The length of the shell attains 49.2 mm; its diameter is 27.5 mm

== Distribution ==
This sinistral species is endemic to Java, Indonesia.
