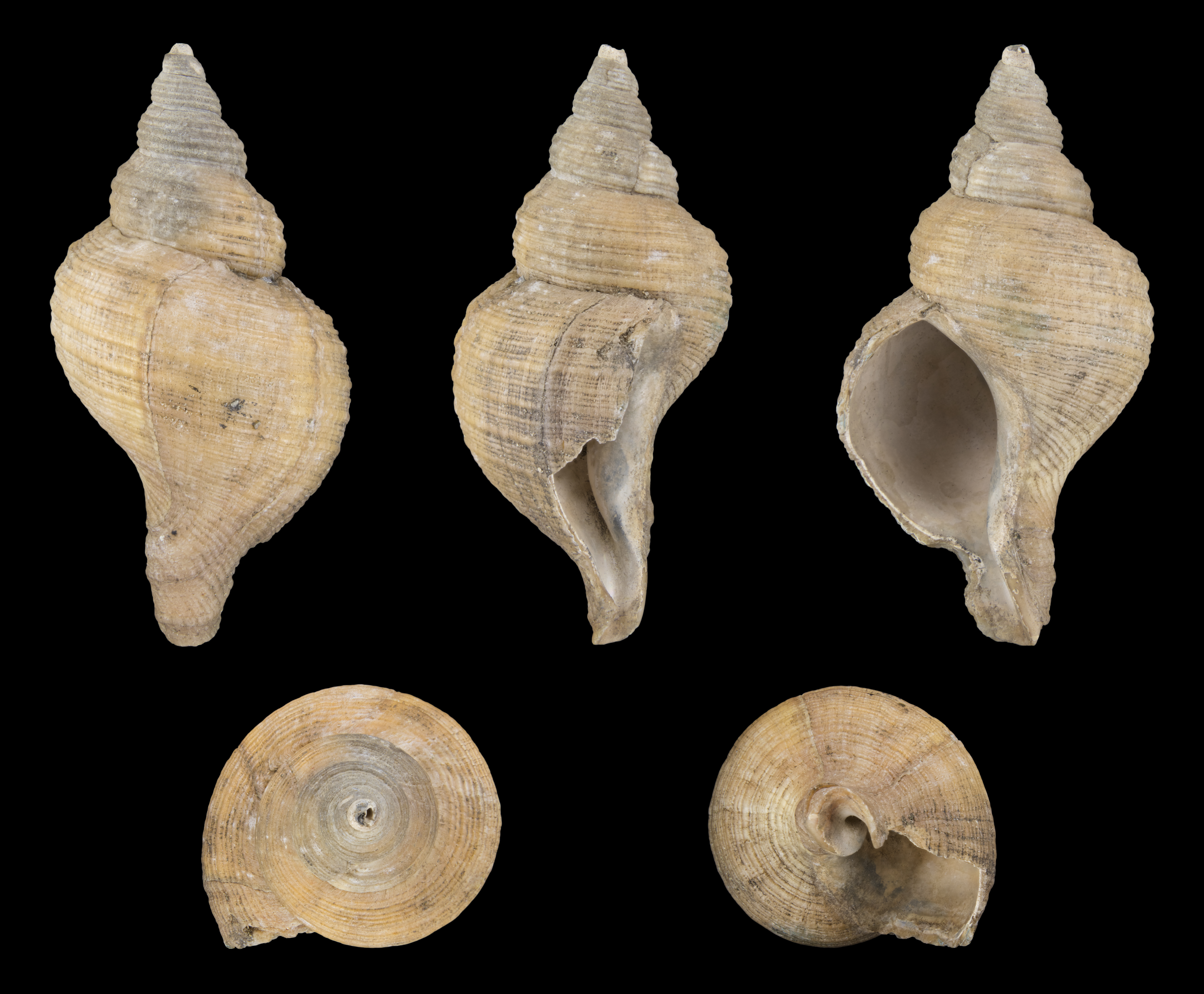
- Neptunea angulata

Scientific classification
- Kingdom: Animalia
- Phylum: Mollusca
- Class: Gastropoda
- Subclass: Caenogastropoda
- Order: Neogastropoda
- Family: Buccinidae
- Genus: Neptunea
- Species: N. angulata

Binomial name
- Neptunea angulata Harmer, 1914

= Neptunea angulata =

Extinct species of gastropod

†Neptunea angulata is an extinct species of large fossil sea snail, a marine gastropod mollusk in the family Buccinidae.

There is some confusion concerning the nomenclature (the naming) of this extinct taxon. The species was formerly known as Neptunea contraria. This is, however, the name of a modern extant species, and therefore the two names are not synonyms. This has been clarified by Nelson & Pain, 1986.

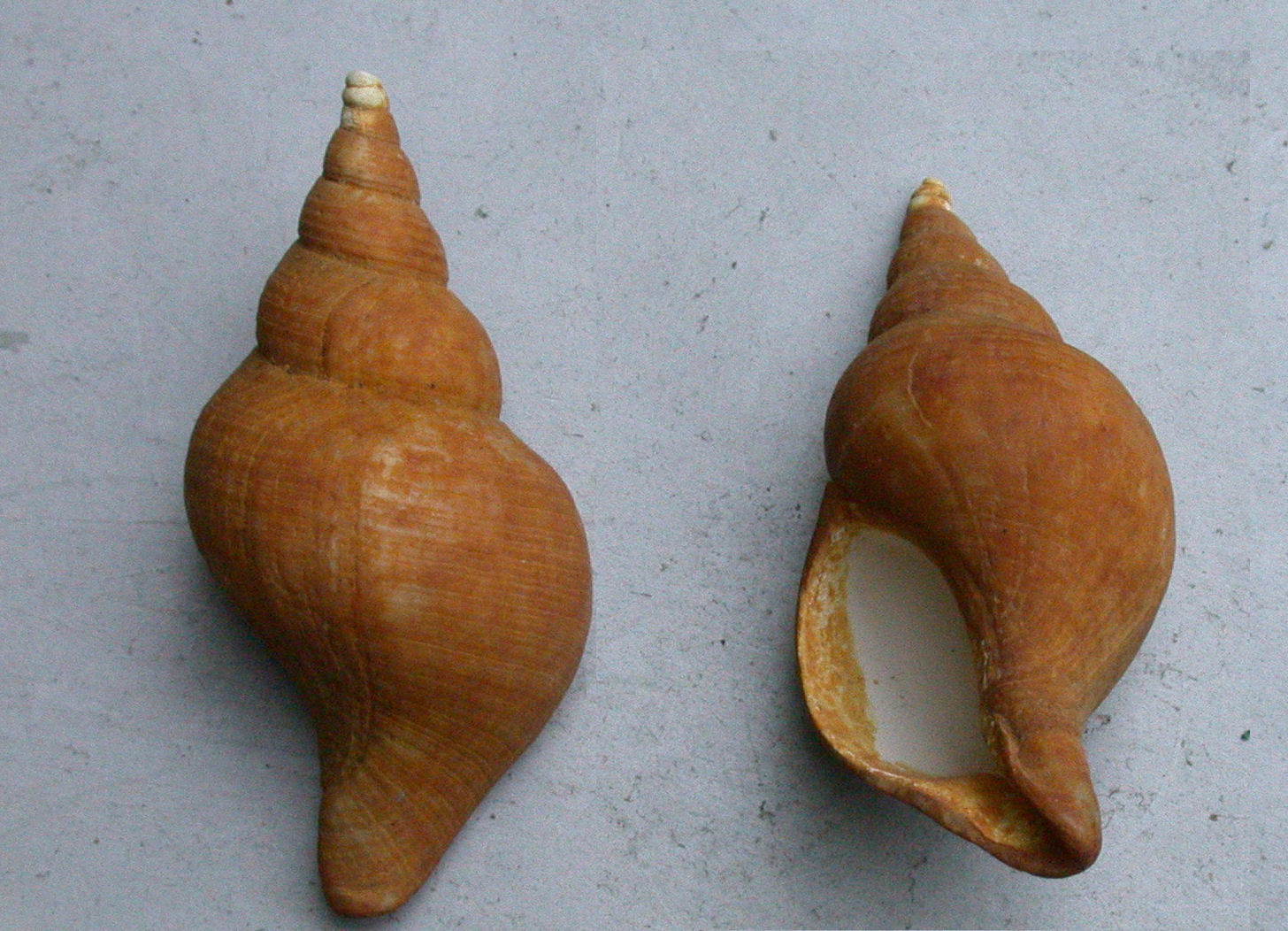
Shells of Neptunea angulata
