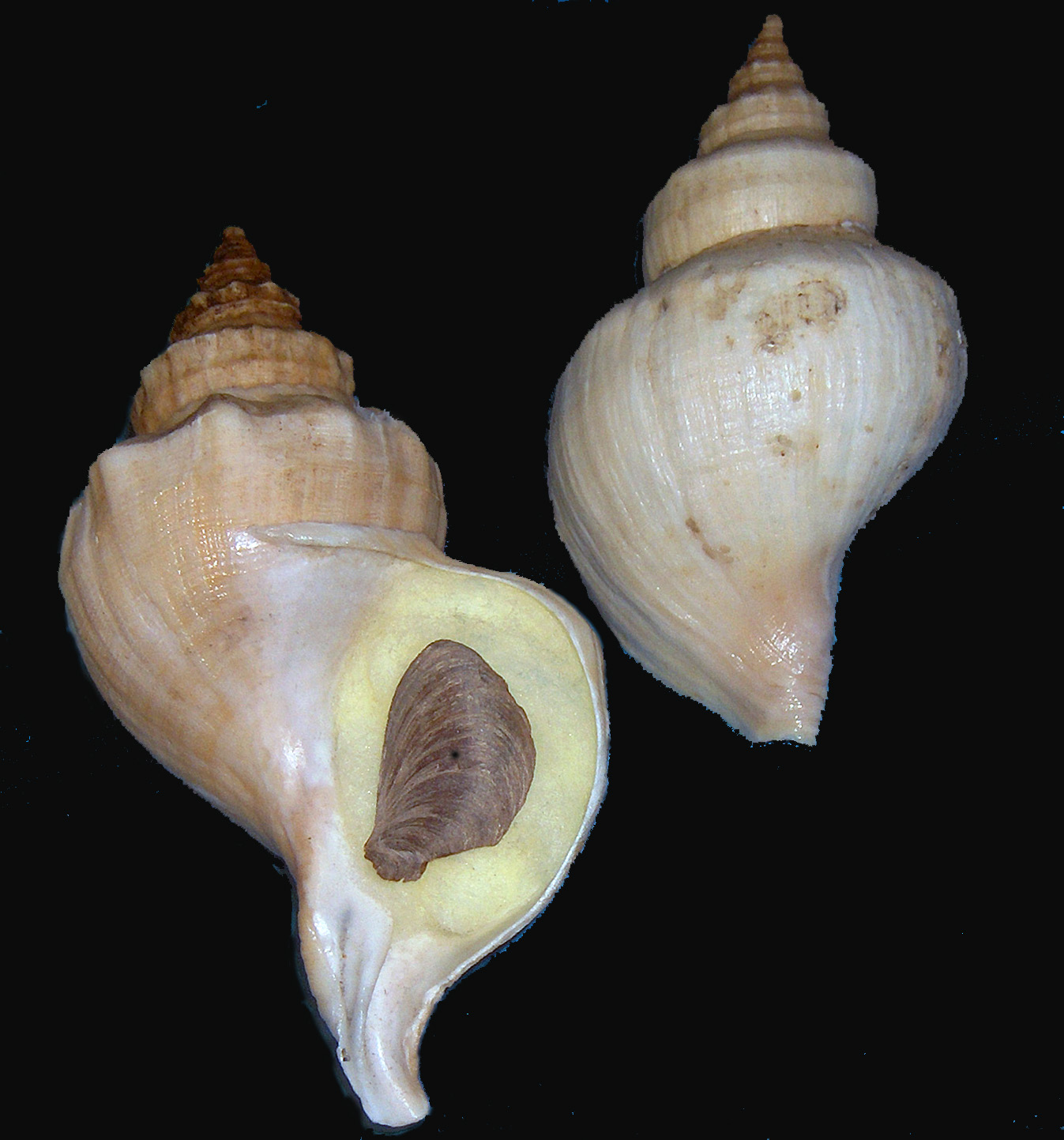
- Two views of a shell of one form of Neptunea despecta

Scientific classification
- Kingdom: Animalia
- Phylum: Mollusca
- Class: Gastropoda
- Subclass: Caenogastropoda
- Order: Neogastropoda
- Family: Buccinidae
- Genus: Neptunea
- Species: N. despecta

Binomial name
- Neptunea despecta (Linnaeus, 1758)

= Neptunea despecta =

Species of gastropod

Neptunea despecta is a species of large sea snail, a marine gastropod mollusk in the family Buccinidae, the true whelks.
