= Supercritical airfoil =

Airfoil designed primarily to delay the onset of wave drag in the transonic speed range

Conventional (1) and supercritical (2) airfoils at identical free stream Mach number. Illustrated are: A – supersonic flow region, B – shock wave, C – area of separated flow. The supersonic flow over a supercritical airfoil terminates in a weaker shock, thereby postponing shock-induced boundary layer separation.

A supercritical airfoil (supercritical aerofoil in British English) is an airfoil designed primarily to delay the onset of wave drag in the transonic speed range.

Supercritical airfoils are characterized by their flattened upper surface, highly cambered ("downward-curved") aft section, and larger leading-edge radius compared with NACA 6-series laminar airfoil shapes. Standard wing shapes are designed to create lower pressure over the top of the wing. Both the thickness distribution and the camber of the wing determine how much the air accelerates around the wing. As the speed of the aircraft approaches the speed of sound, the air accelerating around the wing reaches Mach 1 and shockwaves begin to form. The formation of these shockwaves causes wave drag. Supercritical airfoils are designed to minimize this effect by flattening the upper surface of the wing.

The origins of the supercritical airfoil can be traced back to the German aerodynamicist K. A. Kawalki, who designed a number of airfoils during the Second World War. Following the end of the conflict, multiple nations continued research into the field, including Germany, the United Kingdom, and the United States. In particular, Hawker Siddeley Aviation designed a number of advanced airfoils that were, amongst other programmes, incorporated into the Airbus A300. In America, the aerodynamicist Richard Whitcomb produced supercritical airfoils similar to Kawalki's earlier work; these were used to devise a supercritical wing that was, in turn, incorporated into both civil and military aircraft. Accordingly, techniques learned from studies of the original supercritical airfoil sections have been used to design airfoils for several high-speed subsonic and transonic aircraft, from the Airbus A310 and Boeing 777 airliners to the McDonnell Douglas AV-8B Harrier II jumpjet.

== History ==
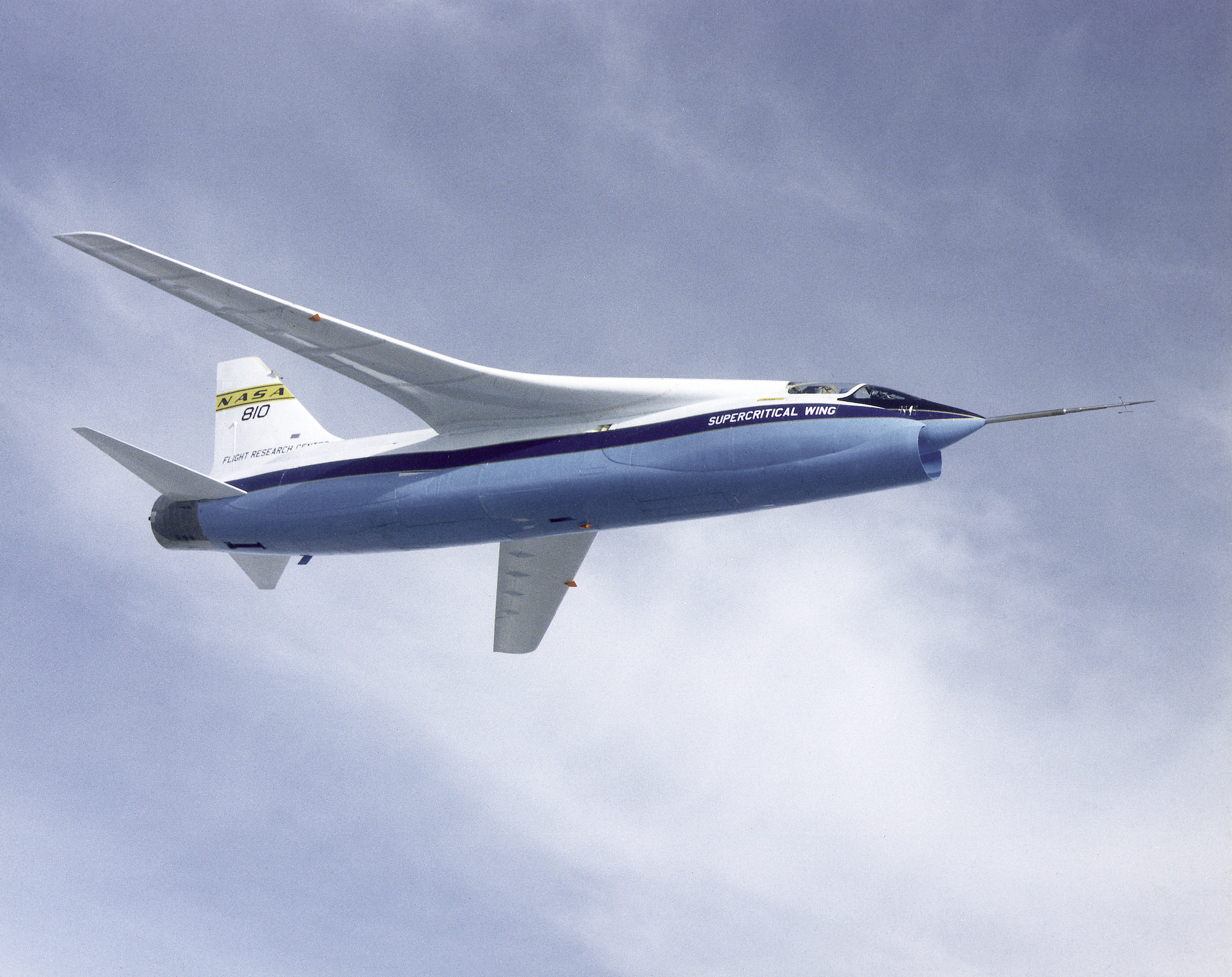
NASA TF-8A in 1973

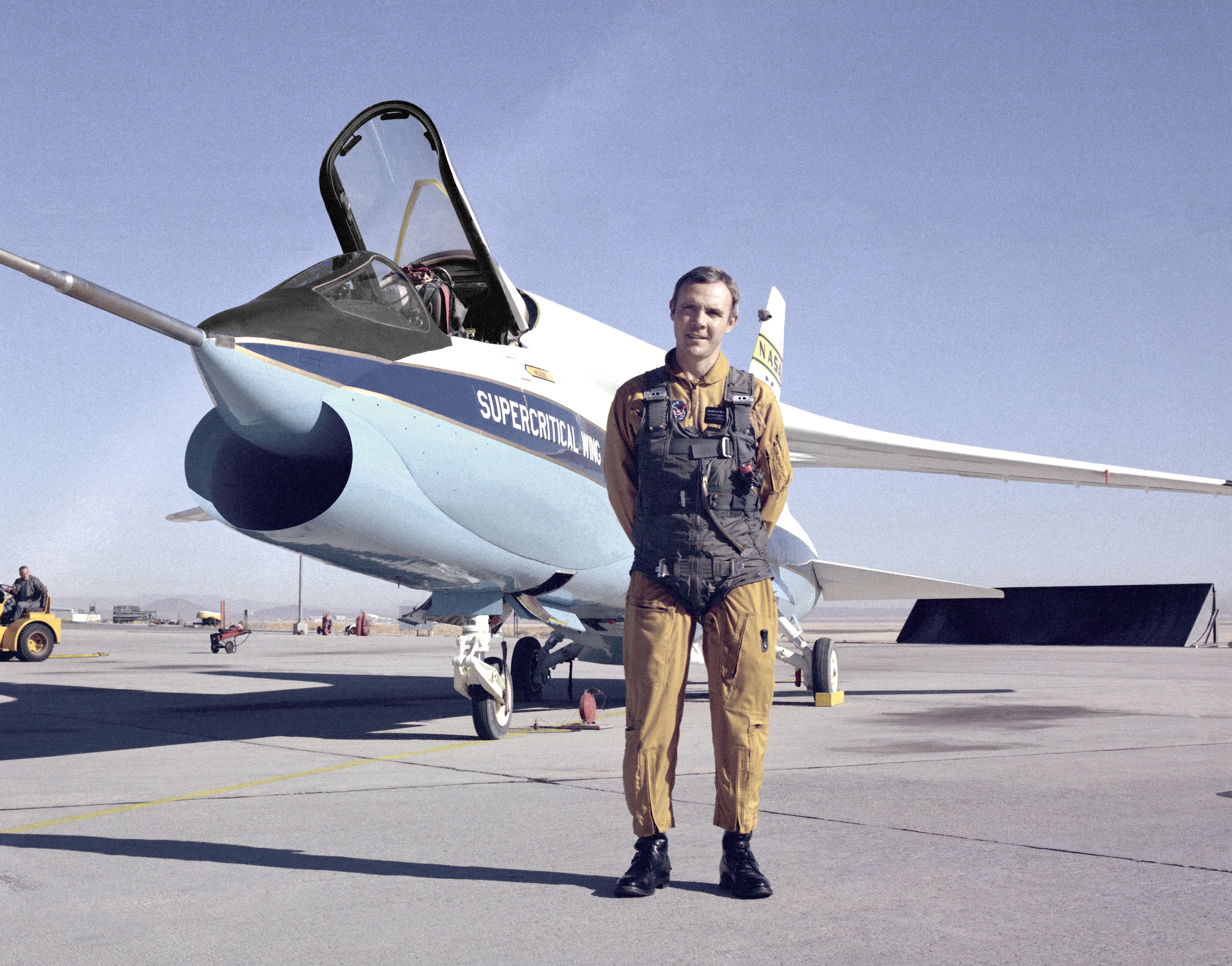
Thomas McMurtry before his flight on the Vought F-8A Crusader Supercritical Wing Airplane

The supercritical airfoil was first suggested by aerodynamicists in Germany during the Second World War. During 1940, K. A. Kawalki at Deutsche Versuchsanstalt für Luftfahrt Berlin-Adlershof designed a number of airfoils characterised by elliptical leading edges, maximal thickness located downstream up to 50% chord and a flat upper surface. Testing of these airfoils was reported by B. Göthert and K. A. Kawalki in 1944. Kawalki's airfoil shapes were similar to those subsequently produced by the American aerodynamicist Richard Whitcomb. The aviation authors Ernst Heinrich Hirschel, Horst Prem, and Gero Madelung have referred to the supercritical airfoil as being of equal importance, in terms of aerodynamics, as the innovation of the swept wing to high speed aircraft.

During the 1950s and 1960s, a number of different high speed research aircraft equipped with conventional airfoils repeatedly encountered difficulties in breaking the sound barrier, or even reaching Mach 0.9. Supersonic airflow over the upper surface of the traditional airfoil induced excessive wave drag, as well as a form of stability loss known as Mach tuck. Aerodynamicists determined that, by appropriately shaping the airfoil used, the severity of these problems could be greatly reduced, allowing the aircraft to attain much higher speeds; this is the basis of the supercritical wing. Its design allows the wing to maintain high performance levels at speeds closer to Mach 1 than traditional counterparts.

In 1962 the Vickers VC-10, which had wing super-critical characteristics, was rolled out. The VC-10 was the first airliner to have a wing section that was specifically designed for the plane (rather than a standard shape). The design was worked on by the Vickers and UK research institutes. Between 1959 and 1968, the British aerospace manufacturer Hawker Siddeley Aviation, based in Hatfield, England, designed its own improved airfoil profiles, which were sometimes referred to as rooftop rear-loaded airfoils. Hawker Siddeley's research subsequently served as the basis for the supercritical wing of the Airbus A300, a multinational wide-body airliner which first flew during 1972. In parallel, postwar Germany and the Netherlands also conducted their own research efforts into optimal transonic airfoil designs, intending for these efforts to support civil aviation programmes. Up until the 1970s, there was considerable focus upon developing an airfoil that performed isentropic recompression, a shock-free return of the airflow to subsonic speeds.

In the United States, the supercritical airfoil was an area of research during the 1960s; one of the leading American figures in the field was Richard Whitcomb. A specially modified North American T-2C Buckeye functioned as an early aerial testbed for the supercritical wing, performing numerous evaluation flights during this period in support of the research effort. Following initial flight testing, the new airfoils were tested at increasingly higher speeds on another modified military aircraft, the TF-8A Crusader.

While the supercritical airfoil had been initially worked on by NASA as part of the United States' National Supersonic Transport programme, the supersonic airliner that was being developed to harness it, the Boeing 2707, was ultimately cancelled due to a combination of technical challenges and relatively high costs. Despite this, the work was one aspect of the programme that survived the cancellation of its principal intended recipient. The supercritical airfoil shape was incorporated into the design of the supercritical wing.

In such a manner, the technology has subsequently been successfully applied to several high-subsonic aircraft, noticeably increasing their fuel efficiency. Early examples include the Boeing 757 and Boeing 767 airliners, both of which were developed during the 1970s. According to Hirschel, Prem and Madelung, the supercritical wing has been regarded as being an essential element of modern jetliners, pointing towards its use on Airbus' product range.

During 1984, Kawalki's research was cited as the basis for a formal objection against the US patent specification that had been issued for the supercritical airfoil. Around this time, Kawalki's work was reportedly playing an active role in the design of new airliners, such as the Airbus A310. Additionally, some aircraft have been redesigned to incorporate supercritical wings; such as the Hawker Siddeley Harrier, popularly known as the Harrier jump jet, which had a second generation AV-8B Harrier II model that adopted a new one-piece supercritical wing to improve cruise performance by delaying the rise in drag and increasing lift-to-drag ratio.

The adoption of the supercritical airfoil amongst modern jet aircraft has diminished the use of some other methods of decreasing wave drag. The anti-shock body was one such method, having also been derived from Richard Whitcomb's work as well as that of the German aerodynamicist Dietrich Küchemann. Alternatively referred to as "Whitcomb bodies" or "Küchemann carrots", it is closely associated with the area rule, a recent innovation of the era to minimise wave drag by having a cross-sectional area which changes smoothly along the length of the aircraft.

== Description ==
=== Benefits ===
Supercritical airfoils feature four main benefits: they have a higher drag-divergence Mach number, they develop shock waves farther aft than traditional airfoils, they greatly reduce shock-induced boundary layer separation, and their geometry allows more efficient wing design (e.g., a thicker wing and/or reduced wing sweep, each of which may allow a lighter wing). At a particular speed for a given airfoil section, the critical Mach number, flow over the upper surface of an airfoil can become locally supersonic, but slows down to match the pressure at the trailing edge of the lower surface without a shock. However, at a certain higher speed, the drag-divergence Mach number, a shock is required to recover enough pressure to match the pressures at the trailing edge. This shock causes transonic wave drag and can induce flow separation behind it; both have negative effects on the airfoil's performance.

Supercritical airfoil Mach number/pressure coefficient diagram (y axis: Mach number, or pressure coefficient, negative up; x axis: position along chord, leading edge left). The sudden increase in pressure coefficient at midchord is due to the shock.

At a certain point along the airfoil, a shock is generated, which increases the pressure coefficient to the critical value C_{p-crit}, where the local flow velocity will be Mach 1. The position of this shockwave is determined by the geometry of the airfoil; a supercritical foil is more efficient because the shockwave is minimized and is created as far aft as possible, thus reducing drag. Compared to a typical airfoil section, the supercritical airfoil creates more of its lift at the aft end, due to its more even pressure distribution over the upper surface.

In addition to improved transonic performance, a supercritical wing's enlarged leading edge gives it excellent high-lift characteristics. Consequently, aircraft utilizing a supercritical wing have superior takeoff and landing performance. This makes the supercritical wing a favorite for designers of cargo transport aircraft. A notable example of one such heavy-lift aircraft that uses a supercritical wing is the Boeing C-17 Globemaster III.

=== Stall characteristics ===
The stall behavior of supercritical profile is unlike that of low-speed airfoils. The boundary layer along the leading edge of a supercritical wing begins thin and laminar at cruise angles. As angle of attack (AOA) increases, this laminar layer detaches in a narrow region and forms a short bubble. The airflow, now turbulent, reattaches to the surface aft of the bubble; the increase in drag is not extreme in this condition. However, if AOA is increased to the stalling point, an adverse pressure gradient builds, and a shockwave can form within the thin boundary layer ahead of the bubble, even at relatively low speed. At the critical angle, the bubble rapidly expands ("bursts"), causing airflow to suddenly detach from the entire surface (from leading to trailing edge). The abrupt loss of lift is exacerbated by the lack of traditional stall "warning" or buffet as a low-speed contour would provide.

Due to this lack of buffet warning, aircraft using supercritical wings are routinely equipped with stick-shaker alert and stick-pusher recovery systems, to meet certification requirements. Since wing fences "prevent the entire wing from stalling at once", they may also form an alternative means of providing recovery in this respect.

== See also ==
- Whitcomb area rule
- NACA airfoil
- Vought F-8 Crusader (TF-8A)
