= Drag-divergence Mach number =

Concept in aerodynamics

The drag-divergence Mach number (not to be confused with critical Mach number) is the Mach number at which the aerodynamic drag on an airfoil begins to increase rapidly as the Mach number continues to increase. This increase can cause the drag coefficient to rise to more than ten times its low-speed value.

The value of the drag-divergence Mach number is typically greater than 0.6; therefore it is a transonic effect. The drag-divergence Mach number is usually close to, and always greater than, the critical Mach number. Generally, the drag coefficient peaks at Mach 1.0 and begins to decrease again after the transition into the supersonic regime above approximately Mach 1.2.

The large increase in drag is caused by the formation of a shock wave on the upper surface of the airfoil, which can induce flow separation and adverse pressure gradients on the aft portion of the wing. This effect requires that aircraft intended to fly at supersonic speeds have a large amount of thrust. In early development of transonic and supersonic aircraft, a steep dive was often used to provide extra acceleration through the high-drag region around Mach 1.0. This steep increase in drag gave rise to the popular false notion of an unbreakable sound barrier, because it seemed that no aircraft technology in the foreseeable future would have enough propulsive force or control authority to overcome it. Indeed, one of the popular analytical methods for calculating drag at high speeds, the Prandtl–Glauert rule, predicts an infinite amount of drag at Mach 1.0.

Two of the important technological advancements that arose out of attempts to conquer the sound barrier were the Whitcomb area rule and the supercritical airfoil. A supercritical airfoil is shaped to make the drag-divergence Mach number significantly higher than the critical Mach number, allowing aircraft to cruise faster (transonically) than with previous subsonic cruise limits. These, along with other advancements including computational fluid dynamics, have been able to reduce the factor of increase in drag to two or three for modern aircraft designs.

Drag-divergence Mach numbers M_{dd} for a given family of propeller airfoils can be approximated by Korn's relation:

$$M_\text{dd} + \frac{1}{10}c_{l,\text{design}} + \frac{t}{c} = K,$$

where

$M_\text{dd}$ is the drag-divergence Mach number,
$c_{l,\text{design}}$ is the coefficient of lift of a specific section of the airfoil,
t is the airfoil thickness at a given section,
c is the chord length at a given section,
$K$ is a factor established through CFD analysis:

K = 0.87 for conventional airfoils (6 series),
K = 0.95 for supercritical airfoils.

== See also ==
- Coffin corner
- Critical Mach number
- Sound barrier
- Speed of sound
- Supercritical airfoil
- Wave drag
