= Subsonic aircraft =

Aircraft with a maximum speed less than the speed of sound

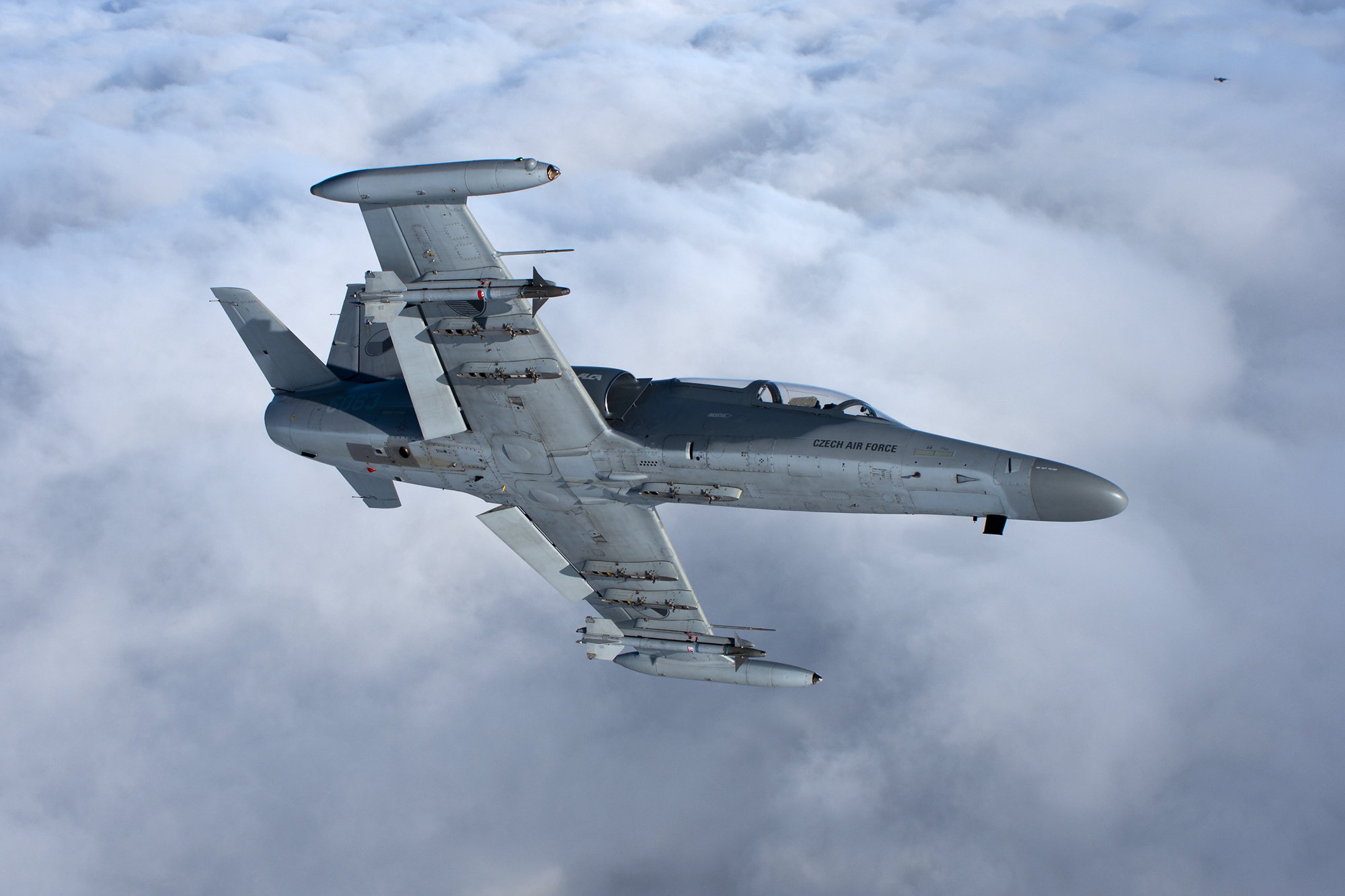
Czech subsonic multi-role combat aircraft Aero L-159 ALCA.

A subsonic aircraft is an aircraft with a maximum speed less than the speed of sound (Mach 1). The term technically describes an aircraft that flies below its critical Mach number, typically around Mach 0.8. All current civil aircraft, including airliners, helicopters, future passenger drones, personal air vehicles and airships, as well as many military types, are subsonic.

== Characteristics ==
Although high speeds are usually desirable in an aircraft, supersonic flight requires much bigger engines, higher fuel consumption and more advanced materials than subsonic flight. A subsonic type therefore costs far less than the equivalent supersonic design, has greater range and causes less harm to the environment.

The less harsh subsonic environment also allows a much wider range of aircraft types, such as balloons, airships and rotorcraft, allowing them to fill a much wider range of roles.

=== Subsonic aerodynamics ===
Subsonic flight is characterised aerodynamically by incompressible flow, where dynamic pressure changes due to motion through the air cause the air to flow away from areas of high dynamic pressure to areas of lower dynamic pressure, leaving the static pressure and density of the surrounding air constant. At high subsonic speeds, compressibility effects begin to appear.

=== Propulsion ===
The propeller is one of the most efficient sources of thrust available and is common on subsonic aeroplanes and airships. Sometimes it is enclosed in the form of a ducted fan. At higher subsonic speeds and at high altitudes, such as attained by most airliners, the turbojet or turbofan becomes necessary. Pure jets such as the turbojet and ramjet are inefficient at subsonic speeds and not often used.

== Wing design ==
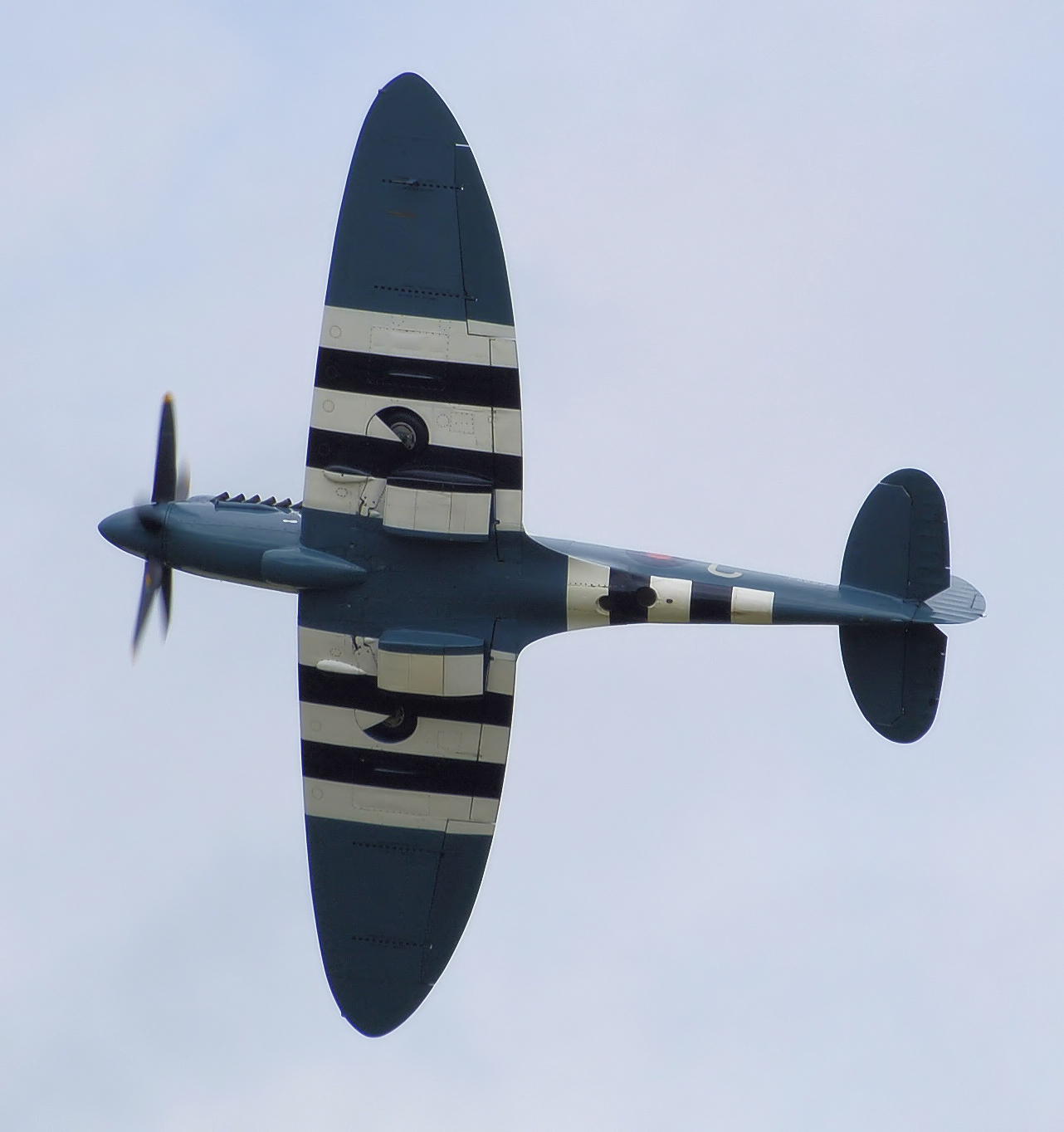
A Spitfire built in 1945 shows off its straight elliptical wing

The span and area of a wing are both important to the lift characteristics. They are related by the aspect ratio, which is the ratio of the span, measured from tip to tip, to the average chord, measured from leading edge to trailing edge.

The aerodynamic efficiency of a wing is described by its lift/drag ratio, with a wing giving high lift for little drag being the most efficient. A higher aspect ratio gives a higher lift/drag ratio and so is more efficient.

The drag of a wing consists of two components: the induced drag, which is related to the production of lift, and the profile drag, largely due to skin friction which is contributed to by the whole wing area. It is therefore desirable for a wing to have the least area compatible with the desired lift characteristics. This is best achieved with a high aspect ratio, and high-performance types often have this kind of wing.

But other considerations such as light weight, structural stiffness, manoeuvrability, ground handling and so on often benefit from a shorter span and, consequently a less efficient wing. Small, low-altitude general aviation planes typically have aspect ratios of six or seven; airliners of 12 or more; and high-performance sailplanes of 30 or more.

At speeds above the critical Mach number, the airflow begins to become transonic, with local airflow in some places causing small sonic shock waves to form. This soon leads to the shock stall, causing a rapid increase in drag. The wings of fast subsonic craft such as jet airliners tend to be swept in order to delay the onset of these shock waves.

In theory, induced drag is at its minimum when the span wise distribution of lift is elliptical. A number of factors influence induced drag, however, and as a practical matter a wing of elliptical planform, like that of the Supermarine Spitfire fighter of World War II, is not necessarily the most efficient. The wings of jet airliners, which are highly optimized for efficiency, are far from elliptical in shape.

The ratio of tip chord to root chord is called the taper ratio. Taper has the desirable effect of reducing the root bending stress by shifting the lift inboard, but it has been argued by some noted designers, including John Thorp and Karl Bergey, that an untapered rectangular planform is best for aeroplanes of less than 6,000 pounds gross weight.

== See also ==
- Sound barrier
- Supersonic aircraft
