= Shock stall =

Aerodynamic stall caused by shockwaves

A shock stall is a stall created when the airflow over an aircraft's wings is disturbed by shock waves formed when flying at or above the aircraft's drag divergence Mach number. Shock stall may cause control problem during speed transition (transonic to supersonic). Thin supercritical wing section and swept-back wing can postpone shock stall to higher speed.

A stall is the decrease in lift to a value below the weight, and the associated increase in drag upon the separation of the boundary layer (in this case behind the shock wave).

A shock stall occurs, when the lift coefficient as function of the Mach Number reaches its maximum value.
