= Tailplane =

Small lifting surface of a fixed-wing aircraft

The horizontal stabiliser is the fixed horizontal surface of the empennage

A tailplane, also known as a horizontal stabiliser, is a small lifting surface located on the tail (empennage) behind the main lifting surfaces of a fixed-wing aircraft. Gyroplanes and some helicopters also feature horizontal stabilisers as part of their tail assembly. Not all fixed-wing aircraft have tailplanes. Canards, tailless and flying wing aircraft have no separate tailplane, while in V-tail aircraft the vertical stabiliser, rudder, and the tail-plane and elevator are combined to form two diagonal surfaces in a V layout.

The function of the tailplane is to provide stability and control. In particular, the tailplane helps adjust for changes in position of the centre of pressure or centre of gravity caused by changes in speed and attitude, fuel consumption, or dropping cargo or payload.

== Tailplane types ==
The tailplane comprises the tail-mounted fixed horizontal stabiliser and movable elevator. Besides its planform, it is characterised by:

- Number of tailplanes - from 0 (tailless or canard) to 3 (Roe triplane)
- Location of tailplane - mounted high, mid or low on the fuselage, fin or tail booms.
- Fixed stabiliser and movable elevator surfaces; movable stabiliser and movable elevator (e.g. Boeing 737); or a single combined stabilator (e.g. General Dynamics F-111 Aardvark)

Some locations have been given special names:

- Cruciform: mid-mounted on the fin (Hawker Sea Hawk, Sud Aviation Caravelle)
- T-tail: high-mounted on the fin (Gloster Javelin, Boeing 727)
- V-tail: the horizontal and vertical stabilizers are combined to form a V-shape (Lockheed F-117)

Fuselage mounted
Cruciform
T-tail

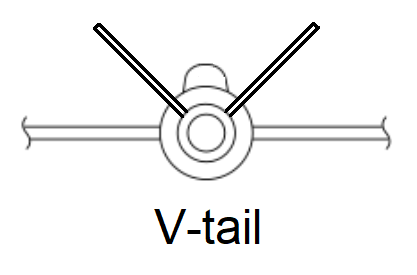

Flying tailplane

== Stability ==
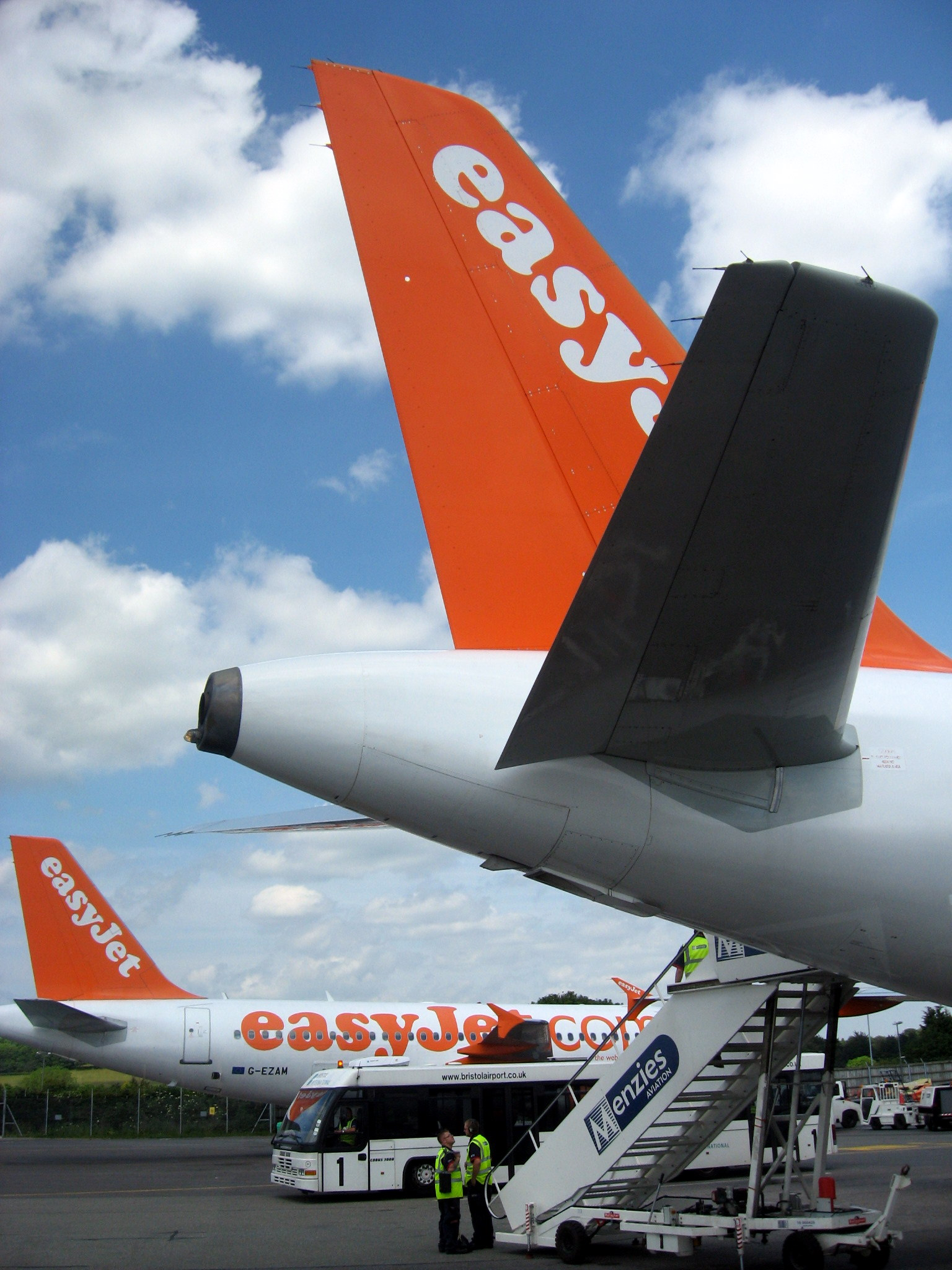
Tailplane (in shadow) of an easyJet Airbus A319

A wing with a conventional aerofoil profile makes a negative contribution to longitudinal stability. This means that any disturbance (such as a gust) which raises the nose produces a nose-up pitching moment which tends to raise the nose further. With the same disturbance, the presence of a tailplane produces a restoring nose-down pitching moment, which may counteract the natural instability of the wing and make the aircraft longitudinally stable (in much the same way a weather vane always points into the wind).

The longitudinal stability of an aircraft may change when it is flown "hands-off"; i.e. when the flight controls are subject to aerodynamic forces but not pilot input forces.

=== Damping ===
In addition to giving a restoring force (which on its own would cause oscillatory motion) a tailplane gives damping. This is caused by the relative wind seen by the tail as the aircraft rotates around the centre of gravity. For example, when the aircraft is oscillating, but is momentarily aligned with the overall vehicle's motion, the tailplane still sees a relative wind that is opposing the oscillation.

=== Lift ===
Depending on the aircraft design and flight regime, its tailplane may create positive lift or negative lift (downforce). It is sometimes assumed that on a stable aircraft this will always be a net down force, but this is untrue.

On some pioneer designs, such as the Bleriot XI, the centre of gravity was between the neutral point and the tailplane, which also provided positive lift. However this arrangement can be unstable and these designs often had severe handling issues. The requirements for stability were not understood until shortly before World War I – the era within which the British Bristol Scout light biplane was designed for civilian use, with an airfoiled lifting tail throughout its production run into the early World War I years and British military service from 1914 to 1916 – when it was realised that moving the centre of gravity further forwards allowed the use of a non-lifting tailplane in which the lift is nominally neither positive nor negative but zero, which leads to more stable behaviour. Later examples of aircraft from World War I and onwards into the interwar years that had positive lift tailplanes include, chronologically, the Sopwith Camel, Charles Lindbergh's Spirit of St. Louis, the Gee Bee Model R Racer - all aircraft with a reputation for being difficult to fly, and the easier-to-fly Fleet Finch two-seat Canadian trainer biplane, itself possessing a flat-bottom airfoiled tailplane unit not unlike the earlier Bristol Scout. But with care a lifting tailplane can be made stable. An example is provided by the Bachem Ba 349 Natter VTOL rocket-powered interceptor, which had a lifting tail and was both stable and controllable in flight.

Some aircraft and flight modes can require the tailplane to generate substantial downforce. This is particularly so when flying slowly and at a high angle of attack (AoA). On some types, the demand in this flight mode has been so extreme that it has caused the tailplane to stall. On the Gloster Meteor T.7 a stall could be triggered by turbulence when the airbrakes were deployed. On the McDonnell Douglas F-4 Phantom II it initially occurred during takeoff and landing approach, and leading-edge slats were fitted to the tailplane upside-down in order to maintain smooth airflow and downforce "lift" at high AoA. The Pilatus P-3 trainer required a ventral keel to cure a similar effect when spun, while the McDonnell Douglas T-45 Goshawk suffered excess downwash from the wing when the flaps were deployed, necessitating a small "SMURF" surface fixed to the fuselage, such that it aligned with the stabiliser leading-edge root at the critical angle.

=== Active stability ===
Using a computer to control the elevator allows aerodynamically unstable aircraft to be flown in the same manner.

Aircraft such as the F-16 are flown with artificial stability. The advantage of this is a significant reduction in drag caused by the tailplane, and improved manoeuvrability.

=== Mach tuck ===
At transonic speeds, an aircraft can experience a shift rearwards in the centre of pressure due to the buildup and movement of shockwaves. This causes a nose-down pitching moment called Mach tuck. Significant trim force may be needed to maintain equilibrium, and this is most often provided using the whole tailplane in the form of an all-flying tailplane or stabilator.

== Control ==
A tailplane usually has some means allowing the pilot to control the amount of lift produced by the tailplane. This in turn causes a nose-up or nose-down pitching moment on the aircraft, which is used to control the aircraft in pitch.

Elevator: A conventional tailplane normally has a hinged aft surface called an elevator,

Stabilator or all-moving tail: In transonic flight shock waves generated by the front of the tailplane render any elevator unusable. An all-moving tail was developed by the British for the Miles M.52, but first saw actual transonic flight on the Bell X-1; Bell Aircraft Corporation had included an elevator trim device that could alter the angle of attack of the entire tailplane. This saved the program from a costly and time-consuming rebuild of the aircraft.

Transonic and supersonic aircraft now have all-moving tailplanes to counteract Mach tuck and maintain manoeuvrability when flying faster than the critical Mach number. Normally called a stabilator, this configuration is often referred to as an "all-moving" or "all-flying" tailplane.

== See also ==
- Aircraft flight control system
- Flight control surfaces
- Stabilizer (aeronautics)
- T-tail
- Trim tab
