= Anti-shock body =

Pod attached to a plane's aerodynamic surface, to reduce wave drag at transonic speeds

An anti-shock body is a streamlined pod positioned on the upper surface of a wing to reduce wave drag while travelling at transonic speeds (Mach 0.8–1.0), which includes the typical cruising range of conventional jet airliners. Also known as a Whitcomb body, Küchemann carrot or speed bump, it improves area rule distribution.

The anti-shock, or shock, body was one of a number of ways of implementing what was then the recently developed area rule. Another was fuselage shaping.

== Theory ==
The theory behind the anti-shock body was independently developed during the early 1950s, by two aerodynamists, Richard Whitcomb at NASA and Dietrich Küchemann at the British Royal Aircraft Establishment. The anti-shock body is closely associated with the area rule, a recent innovation of the era to minimise wave drag by having a cross-sectional area which changes smoothly along the length of the aircraft. The extension beyond the trailing edge was considered secondary to the body on the wing surface, which slowed the supersonic flow to give a weaker shock and acted as a fence to prevent outward flow. The extension was only long enough to prevent flow separation. Whitcomb stated that the anti-shock body was no longer required on the top surface of a wing when the supercritical airfoil was introduced because they both decreased the strength of, or eliminated, the shock and its attendant drag.

== Applications ==
Aircraft that have used anti-shock bodies are the Convair 990 and Fokker 100 airliners.

Küchemann carrots were added to the Handley Page Victor to provide volume for carrying chaff. They did not improve the performance of the aircraft, and when they became redundant for their intended purpose they were left in place to save the cost of removing them.

Several Tupolev aircraft of the Soviet Union utilized Küchemann carrots as gear storage pods, which were mounted mid-wing and extended past the trailing surface. Examples are the Tu-104, Tu-134 and Tu-154 airliners and the Tu-16 and Tu-95 bombers.

Boeing tested the effect of adding similar bodies to a wind tunnel model of the Boeing 707. Although the speed beyond which the drag rose abruptly was increased, the additional friction drag on the surface area of the bodies cancelled out any advantage.

== Alternative ==
Modern jet aircraft use supercritical airfoils to minimize drag from shockwaves on the upper surface.

== Gallery ==
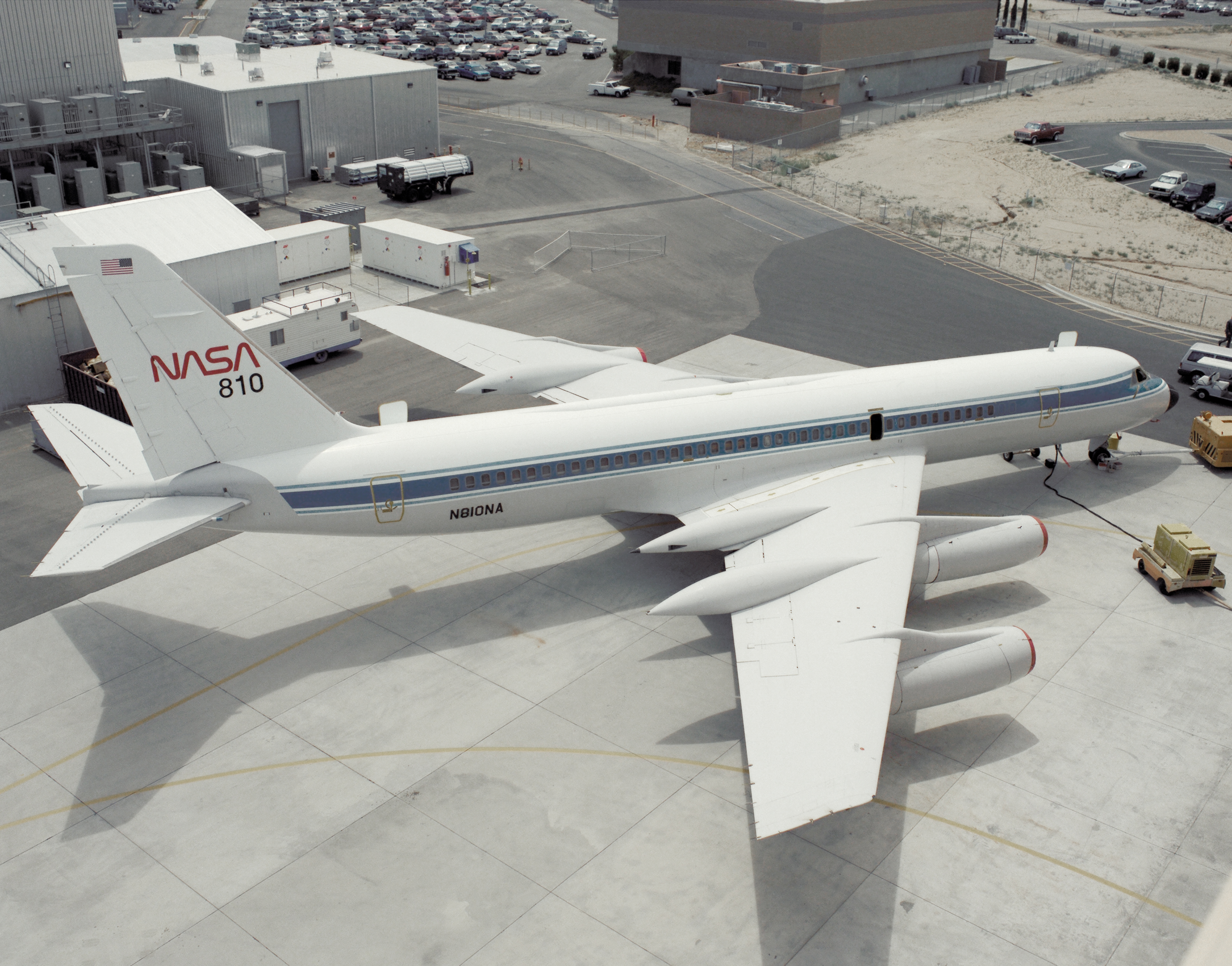
NASA Convair 990 with antishock bodies on the top of the wings

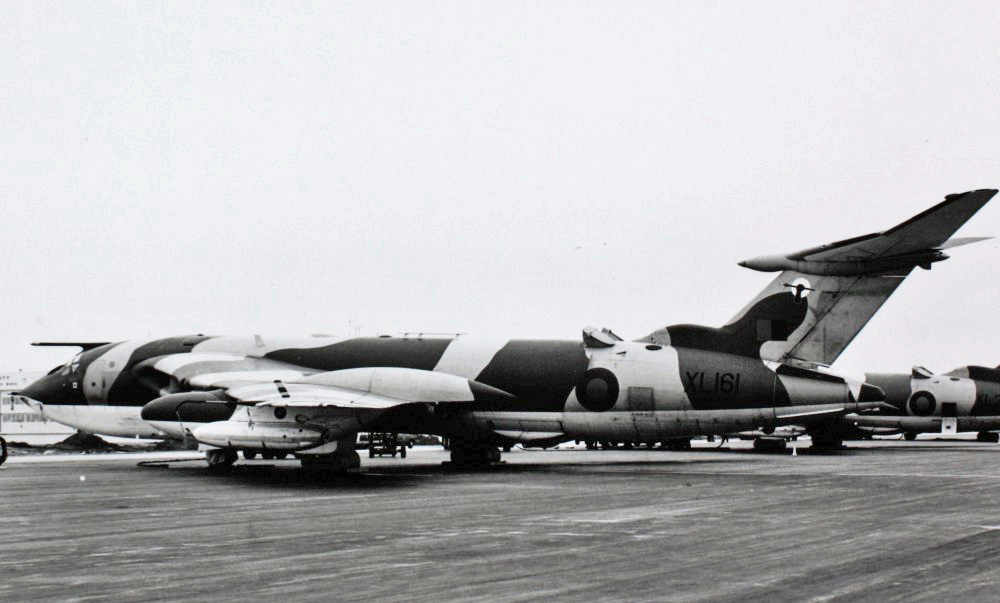
Handley Page Victor B2 with Küchemann carrots on wing surface

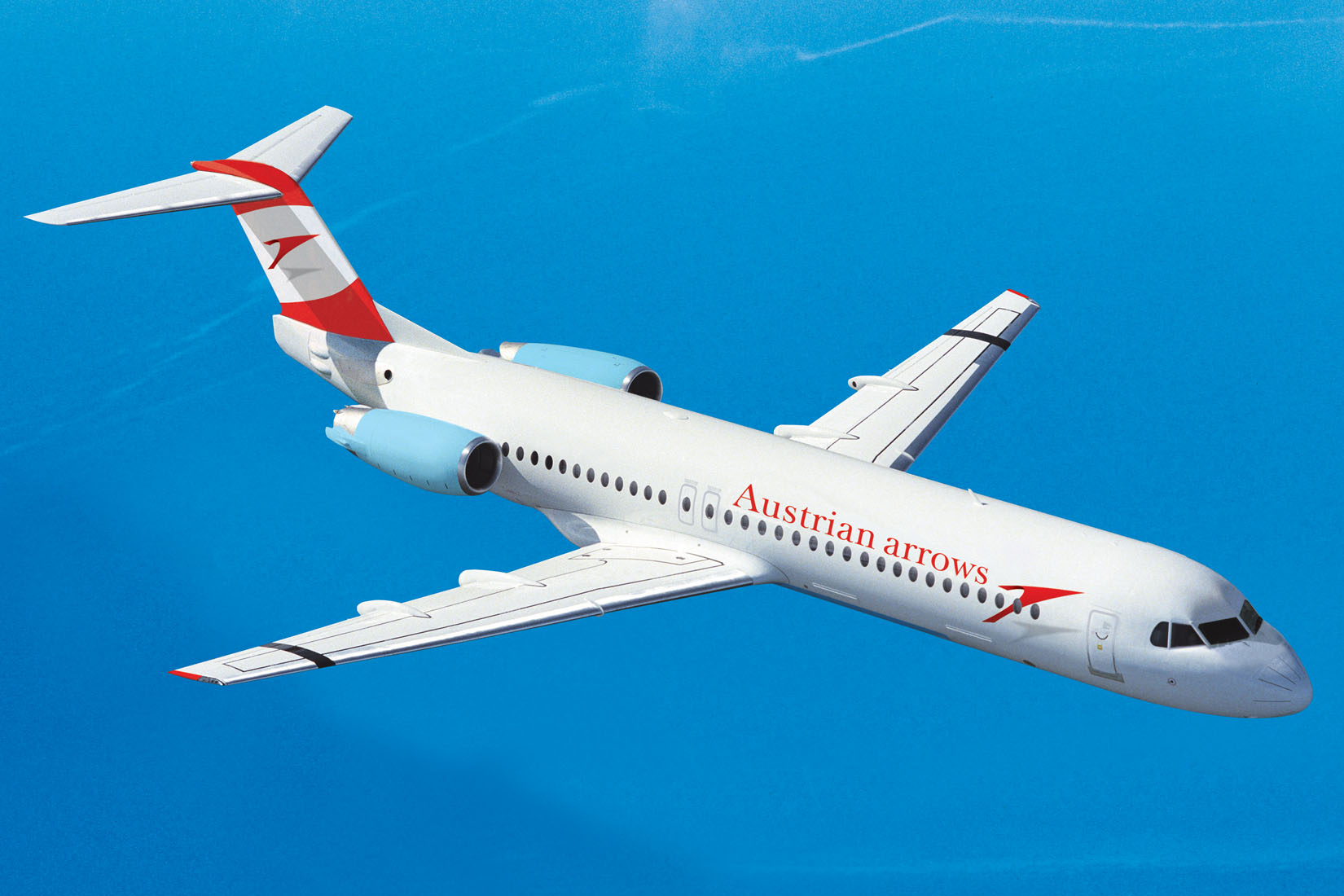
Fokker 100 showing anti-shock bodies on upper surface of wing

Tupolev Tu-154 with undercarriage pods as Küchemann carrots
