= Wave drag =

Component of aerodynamic drag

In aeronautics, wave drag is a component of the aerodynamic drag on aircraft wings and fuselage, propeller blade tips and projectiles moving at transonic and supersonic speeds, due to the presence of shock waves. Wave drag is independent of viscous effects, and tends to present itself as a sudden and dramatic increase in drag as the vehicle increases speed to the critical Mach number. It is the sudden and dramatic rise of wave drag that leads to the concept of a sound barrier.

== Overview ==
Wave drag is a component of pressure drag due to compressibility effects. It is caused by the formation of shock waves around a body. Shock waves create a considerable amount of drag, which can result in extreme drag on the body. Although shock waves are typically associated with supersonic flow, they can form at subsonic aircraft speeds on areas of the body where local airflow accelerates to supersonic speed. The effect is typically seen on aircraft at transonic speeds (about Mach 0.8), but it is possible to notice the problem at any speed over that of the critical Mach of that aircraft. It is so pronounced that, prior to 1947, it was thought that aircraft engines would not be powerful enough to overcome the enhanced drag, or that the forces would be so great that aircraft would be at risk of breaking up in midflight. It led to the concept of a sound barrier.

== Research ==
In 1947, studies into wave drag led to the development of perfect shapes to reduce wave drag as much as theoretically possible. For a fuselage the resulting shape was the Sears–Haack body, which suggested a perfect cross-sectional shape for any given internal volume. The von Kármán ogive was a similar shape for bodies with a blunt end, like a missile. Both were based on long narrow shapes with pointed ends, the main difference being that the ogive was pointed on only one end.

=== Reduction of drag ===
A number of new techniques developed during and just after World War II were able to dramatically reduce the magnitude of wave drag, and by the early 1950s the latest fighter aircraft could reach supersonic speeds.

These techniques were quickly put to use by aircraft designers. One common solution to the problem of wave drag was to use a swept wing, which had actually been developed before World War II and used on some German wartime designs. Sweeping the wing makes it appear thinner and longer in the direction of the airflow, making a conventional teardrop wing shape closer to that of the von Kármán ogive, while still remaining useful at lower speeds where curvature and thickness are important.

The wing need not be swept when it is possible to build a wing that is extremely thin. This solution was used on a number of designs, beginning with the Bell X-1, the first manned aircraft to fly at the speed of sound. The downside to this approach is that the wing is so thin it is no longer possible to use it for storage of fuel or landing gear. Such wings are very common on missiles, although, in that field, they are often referred to as "fins".

Fuselage shaping was similarly changed with the introduction of the Whitcomb area rule. Whitcomb had been working on testing various airframe shapes for transonic drag when, after watching a presentation by Adolf Busemann in 1952, he realized that the Sears-Haack body had to apply to the entire aircraft, not just the fuselage. This meant that the fuselage needed to be made narrower where it joined the wings, so that the cross-section of the entire aircraft matched the Sears-Haack body.

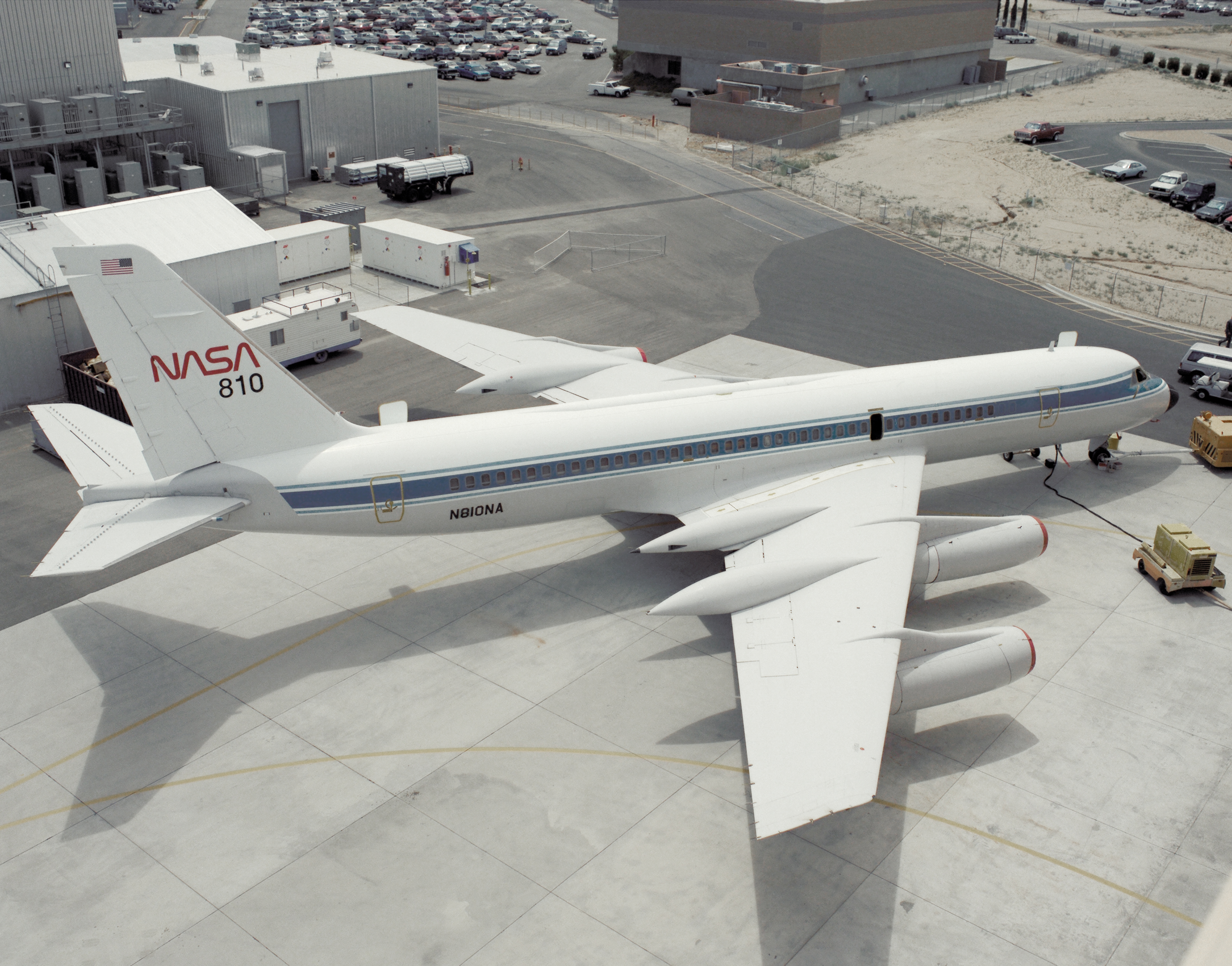
The Convair 990 had particularly obvious anti-shock bodies; modern airliners usually have more subtle shaping for area ruling.

Application of the area rule can also be seen in the use of anti-shock bodies on transonic aircraft, including some jet airliners. Anti-shock bodies, which are pods along the trailing edges of the wings, serve the same role as the narrow waist fuselage design of other transonic aircraft.

== Other drag reduction methods ==
Several other attempts to reduce wave drag have been introduced over the years. The supercritical airfoil is a type that results in reasonable low speed lift like a normal airfoil, but has a profile considerably closer to that of the von Kármán ogive. All modern civil airliners use forms of supercritical aerofoil and have substantial supersonic flow over the wing upper surface.

== Mathematical formula ==
=== For flat plate aerofoil ===
$Cd_w = 4 \cdot \frac{\alpha^2}{\sqrt{(M^2 - 1)}}$

=== For double-wedge aerofoil ===
$Cd_w = 4 \cdot \frac{\alpha^2 + (t/c)^2}{\sqrt{(M^2 - 1)}}$

Where:

$Cd_w$ - Coefficient of drag from wave drag

α - Angle of attack

$\frac{t}{c}$ - Thickness to Chord ratio

M - Freestream Mach number

These equations are applicable at low angles of attack (α < 5°)
