= Mach tuck =

Aerodynamic effect

Mach tuck is an aerodynamic effect whereby the nose of an aircraft tends to pitch downward as the airflow around the wing reaches supersonic speeds. This diving tendency is also known as tuck under. The aircraft will first experience this effect at significantly below Mach 1.

Shock wave above wing moves rearwards as aircraft speed approaches Mach 1

== Causes ==
Mach tuck is usually caused by two things: a rearward movement of the centre of pressure of the wing, and a decrease in wing downwash velocity at the tailplane, both of which cause a nose down pitching moment. For a particular aircraft design only one of these may be significant in causing a tendency to dive—for example, a delta-winged aircraft with no foreplane or tailplane in the first case, and the Lockheed P-38 in the second case. Alternatively, a particular design may have no significant tendency, such as the Fokker F28 Fellowship.

As an aerofoil generating lift moves through the air, the air flowing over the top surface accelerates to a higher local speed than the air flowing over the bottom surface. When the aircraft speed reaches its critical Mach number the accelerated airflow locally reaches the speed of sound and creates a small shock wave, even though the aircraft is still travelling below the speed of sound. The region in front of the shock wave generates high lift. As the aircraft itself flies faster, the shock wave over the wing gets stronger and moves rearwards, creating high lift further back along the wing. It is this rearward movement of lift which causes the aircraft to tuck or pitch nose-down.

The severity of Mach tuck on any given design is affected by the thickness of the aerofoil, the sweep angle of the wing, and the location of the tailplane relative to the main wing.

A tailplane which is positioned further aft can provide a larger stabilizing pitch-up moment.

The camber and thickness of the aerofoil affect the critical Mach number, with a more highly curved upper surface causing a lower critical Mach number.

On a swept wing the shock wave typically forms first at the wing root, especially if it is more cambered than the wing tip. As speed increases, the shock wave and associated lift extend outwards and, because the wing is swept, backwards.

The changing airflow over the wing can reduce the downwash over a conventional tailplane, promoting a stronger nose-down pitching moment.

Another problem with a separate horizontal stabilizer is that it can itself achieve local supersonic flow with its own shock wave. This can affect the operation of a conventional elevator control surface.

Aircraft without enough elevator authority to maintain trim and fly level can enter a steep, sometimes unrecoverable dive. Until the aircraft is supersonic, the faster top shock wave can reduce the authority of the elevator and horizontal stabilizers.

Mach tuck may or may not occur depending on aircraft design. Many modern aircraft have little or no effect.

== Recovery ==
Recovery is sometimes impossible in subsonic aircraft; however, as an aircraft descends into lower, warmer, denser air, control authority (meaning the ability to control the aircraft) may return because drag tends to slow the aircraft while the speed of sound and control authority both increase.

To prevent Mach stall from progressing, the pilot should keep the airspeed below the type's critical Mach number by reducing thrust, extending air brakes, and if possible, extending the landing gear.

== Design features ==
A number of design techniques are used to counter the effects of Mach tuck.

On both conventional tailplane and canard foreplane configurations, the horizontal stabiliser may be made large and powerful enough to correct the large trim changes associated with Mach tuck. In place of the conventional elevator control surface, the whole stabiliser may be made moveable or "all-flying", sometimes called a stabilator. This both increases the authority of the stabilizer over a wider range of aircraft pitch, but also avoids the controllability issues associated with a separate elevator.

Aircraft that fly supersonic for long periods, such as Concorde, may compensate for Mach tuck by moving fuel between tanks in the fuselage to change the position of the centre of mass to match the changing location of the centre of pressure, thereby minimizing the amount of aerodynamic trim required.

A Mach trimmer is a device which varies the pitch trim automatically as a function of Mach number to oppose Mach tuck and maintain level flight.

== History ==
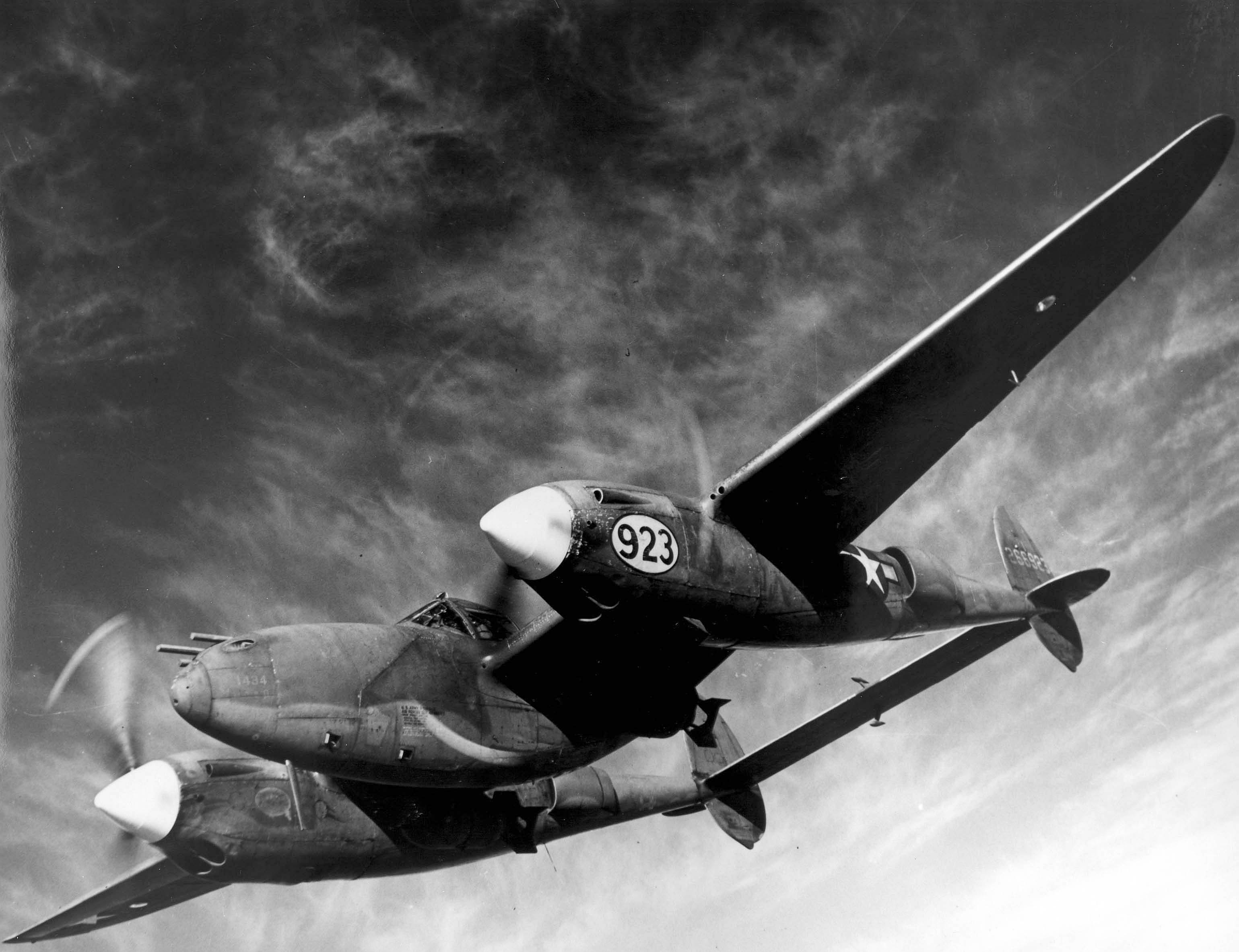
The P-38 Lightning gave Lockheed engineers a great deal of initial design trouble, because it was so fast, it was the first American aircraft to experience compressibility and Mach tuck

The fastest World War II fighters were the first aircraft to experience Mach tuck. Their wings were not designed to counter Mach tuck because research on supersonic airfoils was just beginning; areas of supersonic flow, together with shock waves and flow separation, were present on the wing. This condition was known at the time as compressibility burble and was known to exist on propeller tips at high aircraft speeds.

The P-38 was one of the first 400 mph fighters, and it suffered more than the usual teething troubles. It had a thick, high-lift wing, distinctive twin booms and a single, central nacelle containing the cockpit and armament. It quickly accelerated to terminal velocity in a dive. The short stubby fuselage had a detrimental effect in reducing the critical Mach number of the 15% thick wing center section with high velocities over the canopy adding to those on the upper surface of the wing. Mach tuck occurred at speeds above Mach 0.65; the air flow over the wing center section became transonic, causing a loss of lift. The resultant change in downwash at the tail caused a nose-down pitching moment and the dive to steepen (Mach tuck). The aircraft was very stable in this condition making recovery from the dive very difficult.

Dive recovery (auxiliary) flaps were added to the underside of the wing (P-38J-LO) to increase the wing lift and downwash at the tail to allow recovery from transonic dives.
