= Area rule =

Aerodynamic concept

Cross-sectional area distribution along the complete airframe determines wave drag, largely independent of the actual shape. The blue and light green shapes are roughly equal in area.

The Whitcomb area rule, named after a US National Advisory Committee for Aeronautics (NACA) engineer Richard Whitcomb and also called the transonic area rule, is a design procedure used to reduce an aircraft's drag at transonic speeds which occur between about Mach 0.75 and 1.2. For supersonic speeds a different procedure called the supersonic area rule, developed by NACA aerodynamicist Robert Jones, is used.

Transonic is one of the most important speed ranges for commercial and military fixed-wing aircraft today, with transonic acceleration an important performance requirement for combat aircraft and which is improved by reductions in transonic drag.

== Description ==
At high-subsonic flight speeds, the local speed of the airflow can reach the speed of sound where the flow accelerates around the aircraft body and wings. The speed at which this development occurs varies from aircraft to aircraft and is known as the critical Mach number. The resulting shock waves formed at these zones of sonic flow cause a sudden increase in drag, called wave drag. To reduce the number and strength of these shock waves, an aerodynamic shape should change in cross sectional area as smoothly as possible from front to rear.

=== Transonic area rule ===
The area rule says that two airplanes with the same longitudinal cross-sectional area distribution have the same wave drag, independent of how the area is distributed laterally (i.e. in the fuselage or in the wing). Furthermore, to avoid the formation of strong shock waves the external shape of the aircraft has to be carefully arranged so that the cross-sectional area changes as smoothly as possible going from nose to tail. At the location of the wing, the fuselage is narrowed or "waisted". Fuselage cross-sectional area may need to be reduced by flattening the sides of the fuselage below a bubble canopy and at the tail surfaces to compensate for their presence, both of which were done on the Hawker Siddeley Buccaneer.

=== Supersonic area rule ===
A different area rule, known as the supersonic area rule, developed by NACA aerodynamicist Robert Jones in "Theory of wing-body drag at supersonic speeds", is applicable at speeds beyond transonic, and in this case, the cross-sectional area requirement is established with relation to the angle of the Mach cone for the design speed. For example, consider that at Mach 1.3 the angle of the Mach cone generated by the nose of the aircraft will be at an angle μ = arcsin(1/M) = 50.3° (where μ is the angle of the Mach cone, also known as Mach angle, and M is the Mach number). In this case the "perfect shape" is biased rearward; therefore, aircraft designed for lower wave drag at supersonic speed usually have wings towards the rear.

== Sears–Haack body ==
A superficially related concept is the Sears–Haack body, the shape of which allows minimum wave drag for a given length and a given volume. However, the Sears–Haack body shape is derived starting with the Prandtl–Glauert equation which approximately describes small-disturbance subsonic flows, as well as Ackeret Theory, which closely describes supersonic flow. Both methods lose validity for transonic flows where the area rule applies, due to assumptions made in their derivations. So although the Sears–Haack body shape, being smooth, will have favorable wave drag properties according to the area rule, it is not theoretically optimum.

== History ==
=== Germany ===
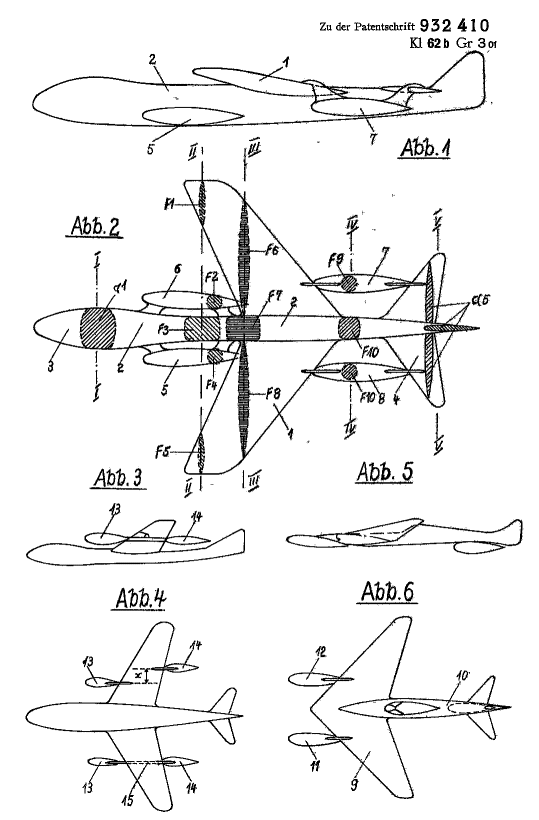
Junkers patent drawing from March 1944

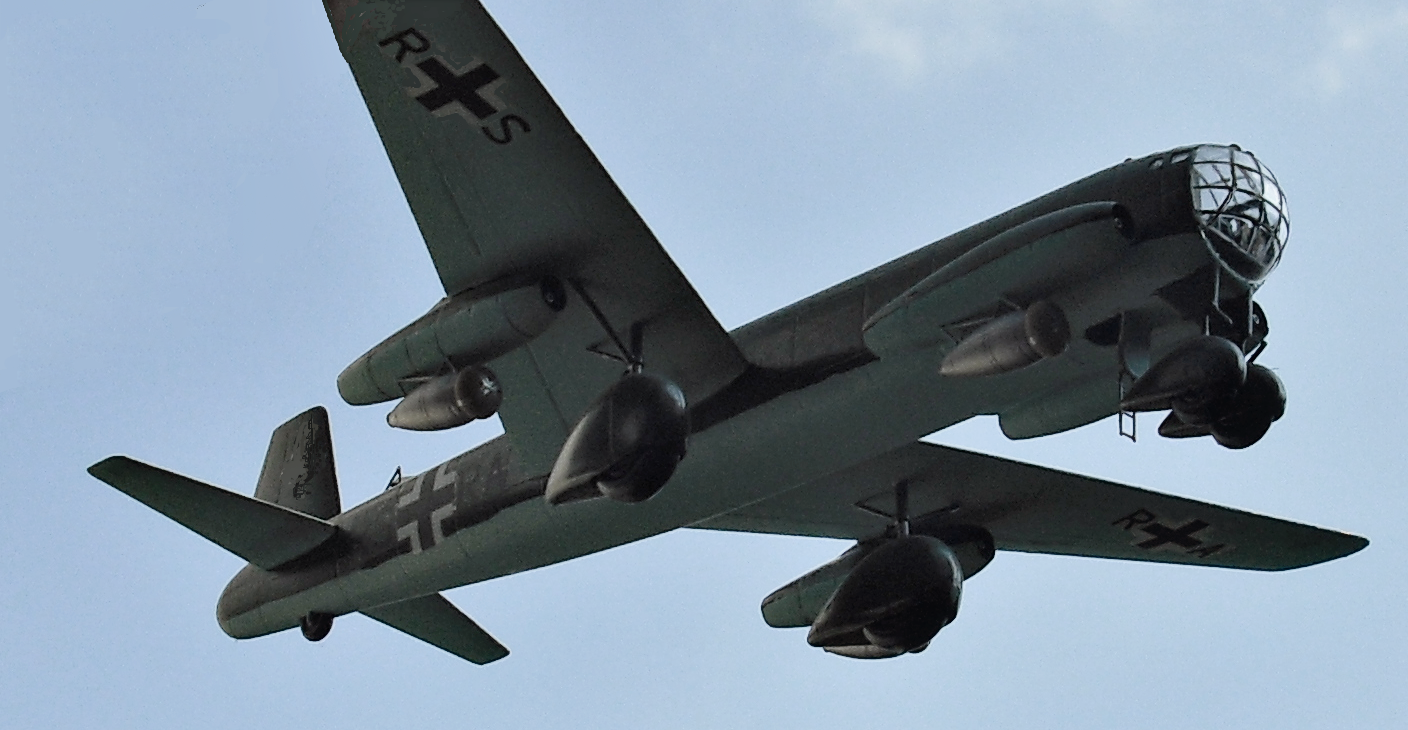
The unusual arrangement of the Ju-287 jet engines is due to the area rule.

The area rule was discovered by Otto Frenzl when comparing a swept wing with a w-wing with extreme high wave drag while working on a transonic wind tunnel at Junkers works in Germany between 1943 and 1945. He wrote a description on 17 December 1943, with the title Anordnung von Verdrängungskörpern beim Hochgeschwindigkeitsflug ("Arrangement of Displacement Bodies in High-Speed Flight"); this was used in a patent filed in 1944. The results of this research were presented to a wide circle in March 1944 by Theodor Zobel at the Deutsche Akademie der Luftfahrtforschung (German Academy of Aeronautics Research) in the lecture "Fundamentally new ways to increase performance of high speed aircraft."

Subsequent German wartime aircraft design took account of the discovery, evident in slim mid-fuselage of aircraft including the Messerschmitt P.1112, P.1106 and Focke-Wulf 1000x1000x1000 type A long-range bomber, but also apparent in delta wing designs including the Henschel Hs 135. Several other researchers came close to developing a similar theory, notably Dietrich Küchemann who designed a tapered fighter that was dubbed the "Küchemann Coke Bottle" when it was discovered by US forces in 1946. In this case Küchemann arrived at the theory by studying airflow, notably the interference, or local flow streamlines, at the junction between a fuselage and swept wing. The fuselage was contoured, or waisted, to match the flow. The shaping requirement of this "near field" approach would also result from Whitcomb's later "far field" approach to drag reduction using his Sonic area rule.

=== United States ===
Wallace D. Hayes, a pioneer of supersonic flight, developed the transonic area rule in publications beginning in 1947 with his PhD thesis at the California Institute of Technology.

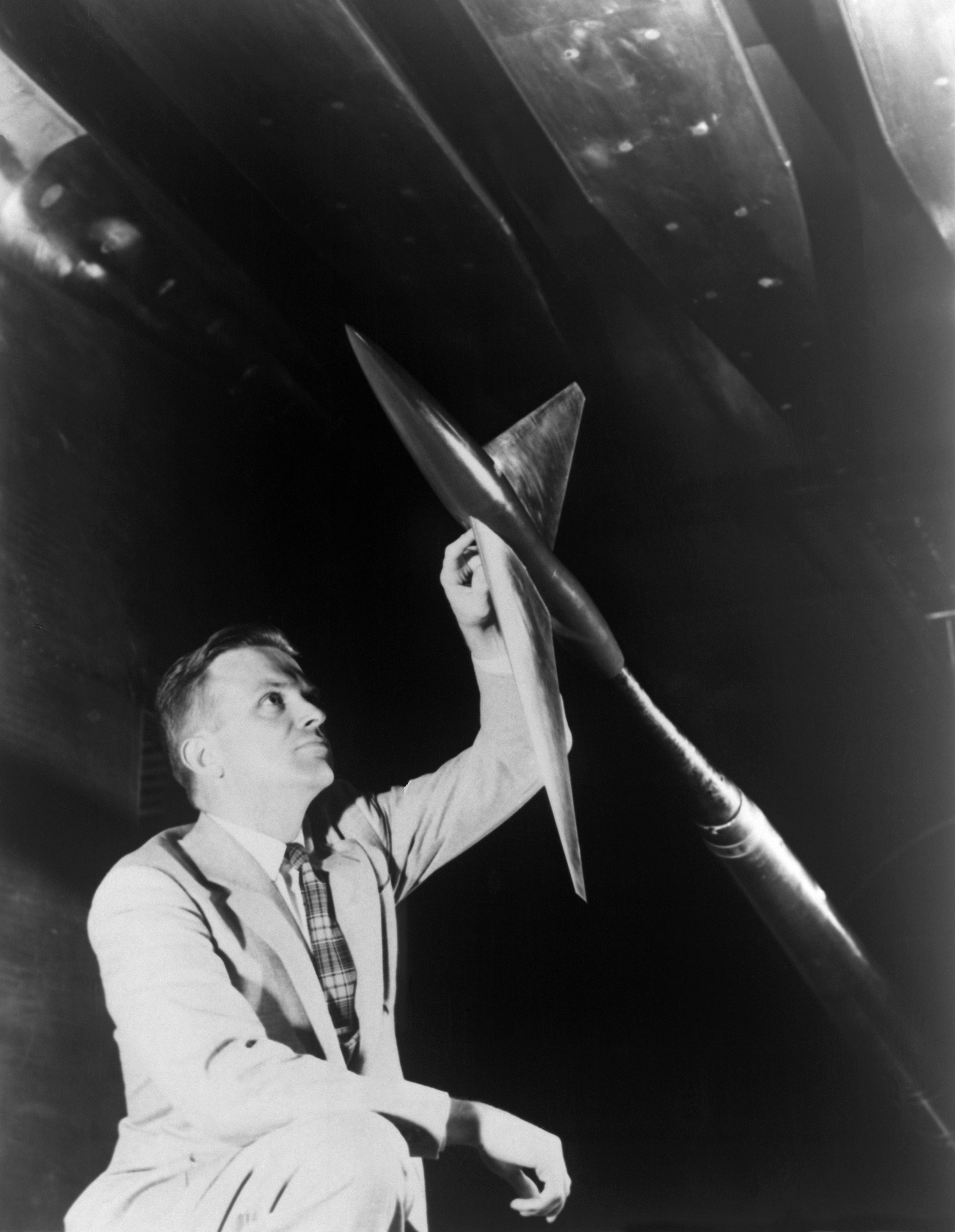
April 1955: Whitcomb examines a model aircraft designed in accordance with his area rule.

Richard T. Whitcomb, after whom the rule is named, independently discovered this rule in 1952, while working at the National Advisory Committee for Aeronautics (NACA). While using the new 8-foot (2.4 m) High-Speed Tunnel, a wind tunnel with performance up to Mach 0.95 at NACA's Langley Research Center, he was surprised by the increase in drag due to shock wave formation. Whitcomb realized that, for analytical purposes, an airplane could be reduced to a streamlined body of revolution, elongated as much as possible to mitigate abrupt discontinuities and, hence, equally abrupt drag rise. The shocks could be seen using Schlieren photography, but the reason they were being created at speeds far below the speed of sound, sometimes as low as Mach 0.70 remained a mystery.

In late 1951, the lab hosted a talk by Adolf Busemann, a famous German aerodynamicist who had moved to Langley after World War II. He talked about the behavior of airflow around an airplane as its speed approached the critical Mach number. Whereas engineers were used to thinking of air flowing smoothly around the body of the aircraft, at high speeds it simply did not have time to "get out of the way", and instead started to flow as if it were rigid pipes of flow, a concept Busemann referred to as "streampipes", as opposed to streamlines, and jokingly suggested that engineers had to consider themselves "pipefitters".

Several days later Whitcomb had a "Eureka" moment. The reason for the high drag was that the "pipes" of air were interfering with each other in three dimensions. One does not simply consider the air flowing over a 2D cross-section of the aircraft as others could in the past; now they also had to consider the air to the "sides" of the aircraft which would also interact with these streampipes. Whitcomb realized that the shaping had to apply to the aircraft as a whole, rather than just to the fuselage. That meant that the extra cross-sectional area of the wings and tail had to be accounted for in the overall shaping, and that the fuselage should actually be narrowed where they meet to more closely match the ideal.

== Applications ==
The first aircraft where the area rule was consequently implemented was the German bomber testbed Junkers Ju-287 (1944). Other corresponding German designs were not completed due to the end of the war or even remained in the planning stage.

When the area rule was re-discovered by Whitcomb, it was made available to the US aircraft industry on a secret basis for military programs from 1952 and it was reported in 1957 for civilian programs. Convair and Grumman, with Whitcomb's help, used it concurrently to design the Grumman F-11 Tiger and to redesign the Convair F-102. The Grumman F-11 Tiger was the first of the two aircraft to fly and had been designed using the area rule from the outset. The Convair F-102 Delta Dagger had to be redesigned as it had been unable to reach Mach 1 although its design speed was Mach 1.2. The expectation that it would reach design speed had been based on optimistic wind-tunnel drag predictions. Modifications which included indenting the fuselage beside the wings and adding more volume to the rear of the aircraft, reduced the transonic drag significantly and the Mach 1.2 design speed was reached. The reason for using the area rule on these fighter aircraft was to reduce the peak value of the drag which occurs at Mach 1 and so enable supersonic speeds with less thrust than would otherwise have been necessary.

In 1957 a modified area rule was available for raising the subsonic cruise speed of transport aircraft by 50 mph (80 km/h). The cruise speed is limited by the sudden increase in drag which indicates the presence of local supersonic flow on top of the wing. Whitcomb's modified rule reduced the supersonic speed before the shock, which weakened it and reduced the drag associated with it. The Convair 990 had bumps called antishock bodies added to the top surface of the wing with the intent of achieving the required cruise speed. However, the area distribution in the channels formed by the nacelle/pylon/wing surfaces also caused supersonic velocities and was the source of significant drag. An area-rule technique, so-called channel area-ruling, was applied to achieve the required cruise speed.

Designers at Armstrong-Whitworth took the sonic area rule a step further in their proposed M-Wing, in which the wing was first swept forward and then to the rear. This allowed the fuselage to be narrowed in front of the root as well as behind it, leading to a smoother fuselage that remained wider on average than one using a classic swept wing.

The extension behind the flight deck on the Rockwell B-1 Lancer and Boeing 747 was added to improve the cross-sectional area distribution according to the area rule.

Aircraft designed according to Whitcomb's area rule (such as the F-102 Delta Dagger and the Northrop F-5) looked odd when they first appeared and were sometimes dubbed "flying Coke bottles", but this became an expected part of the appearance of some transonic aircraft. Visually-apparent indications that the area rule has defined the shape of an aircraft are fuselage "waisting" and tip-tank shaping as on the Northrop F-5, and rear fuselage thinning on business jets with rear engines such as the Bombardier Global Express. The rule also requires careful positioning of parts, like the boosters and cargo bay on rockets. The shape and location of the canopy on the F-22 Raptor as well as the chines and extensively blended fuselage, smooth the transition to the wing leading edge in accordance with area ruling.

The supersonic area rule was applied, at Mach 2, to the prototype Concorde. The rear fuselage was extended by 12.2 feet (3.73 m) on the production aircraft and reduced wave drag by 1.8%.

== Images ==
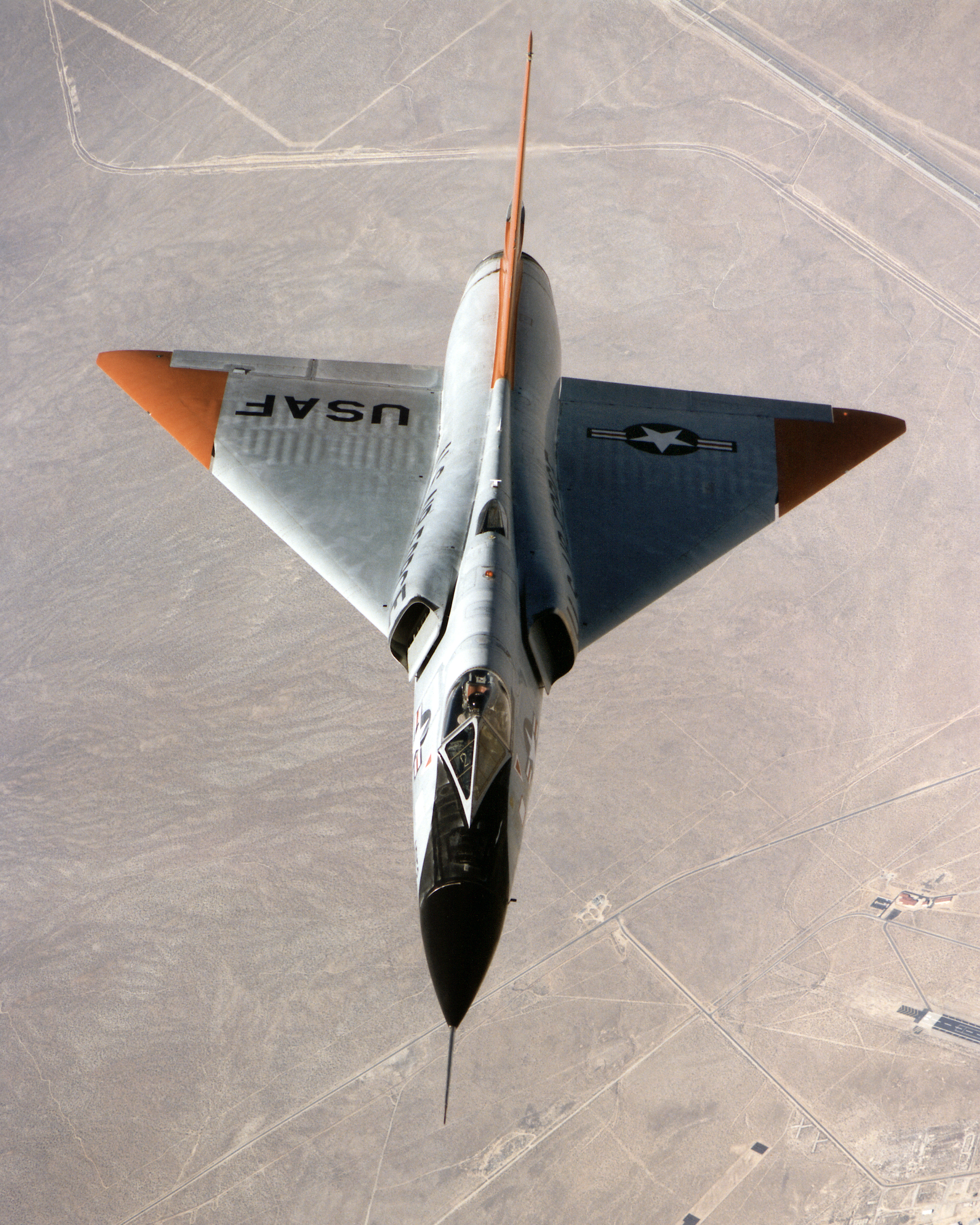
The F-106 Delta Dart, a development of the F-102 Delta Dagger, shows the "wasp-waisted" shaping due to area rule considerations

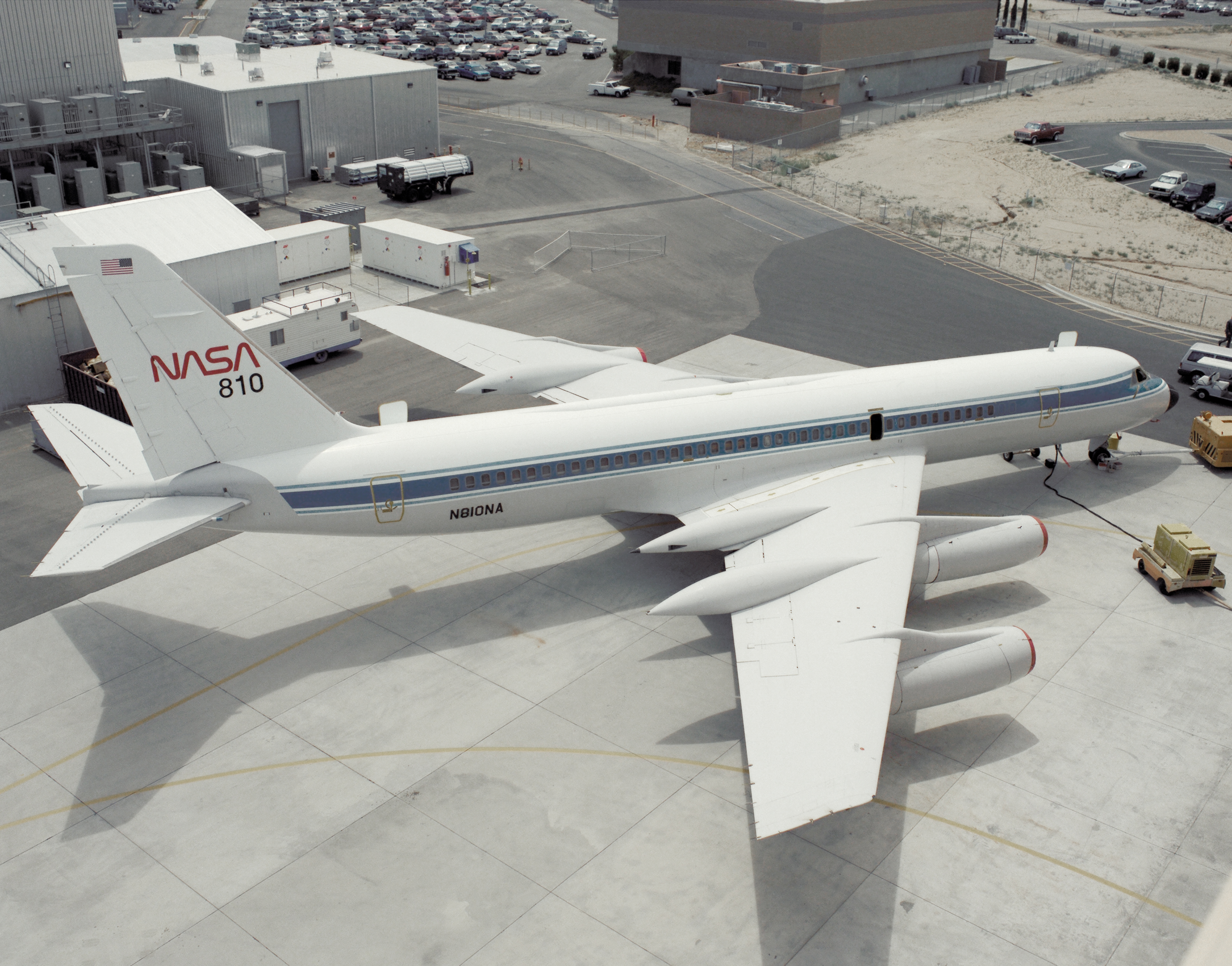
NASA Convair 990 with antishock bodies on the rear of the wings

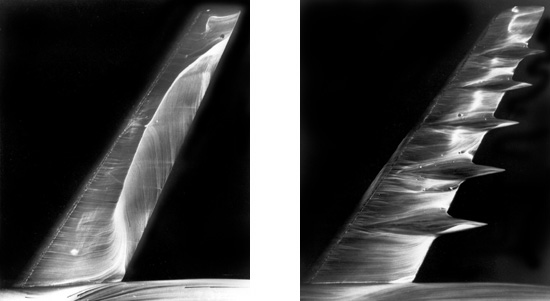
Oilflow visualization of flow separation without and with antishock bodies

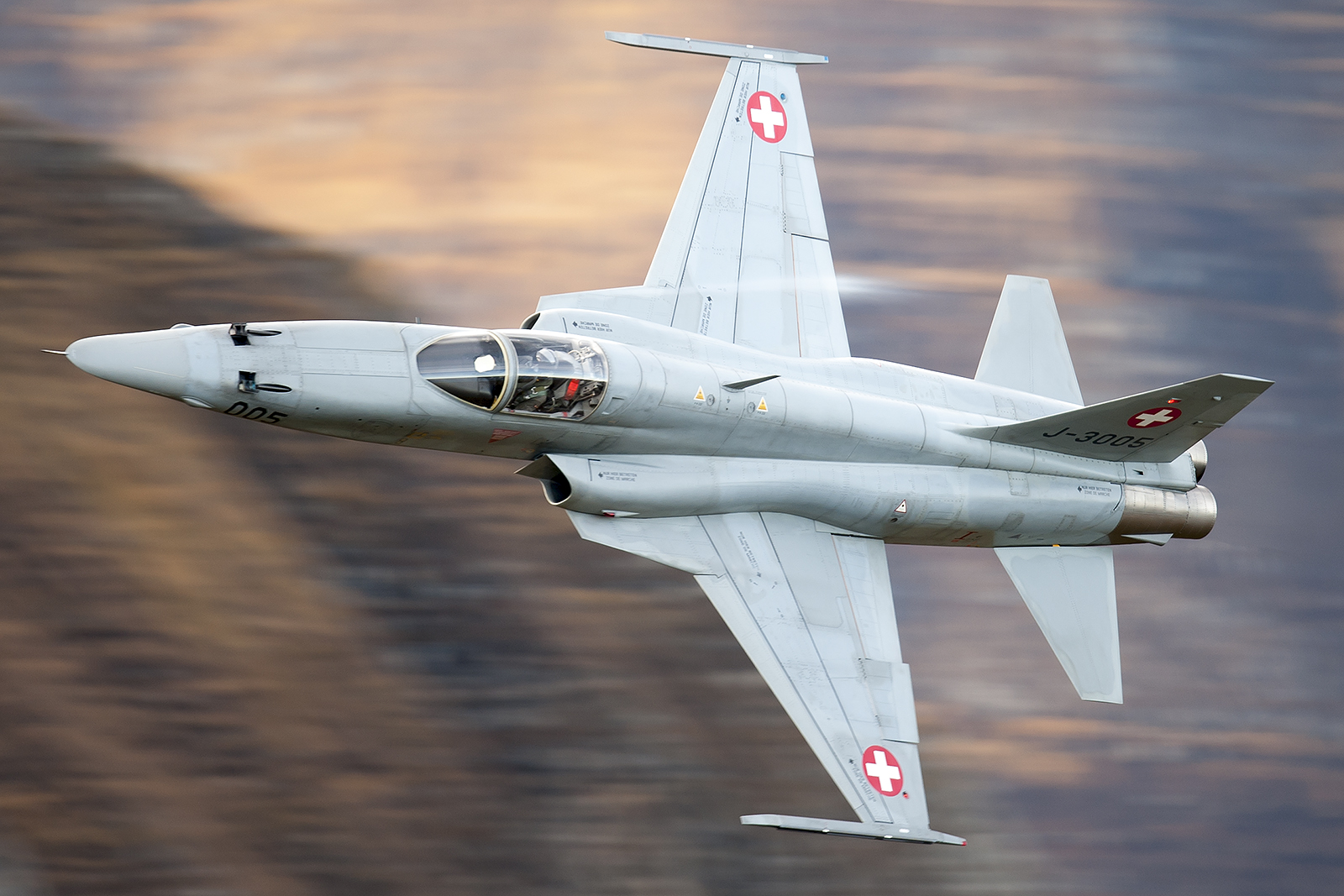
Northrop F-5 showing fuselage waisting

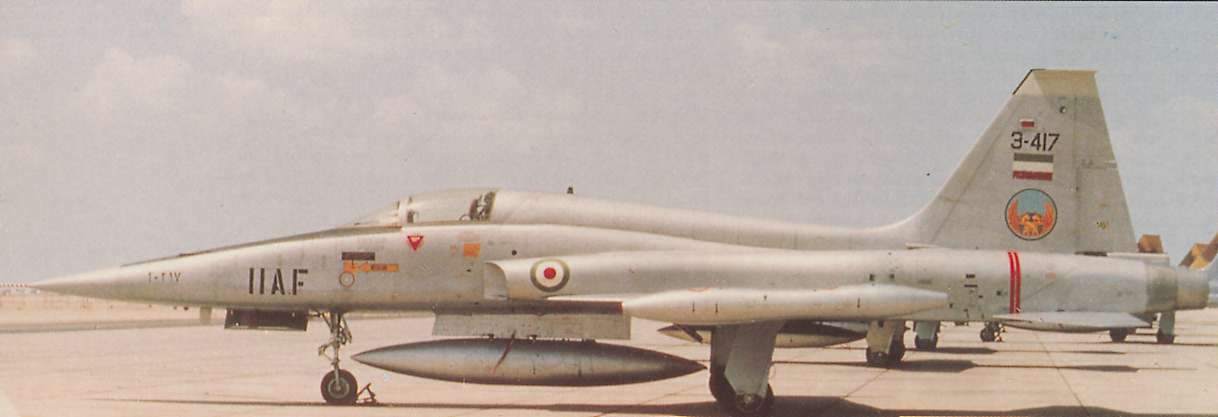
Northrop F-5 showing tip-tank shaping

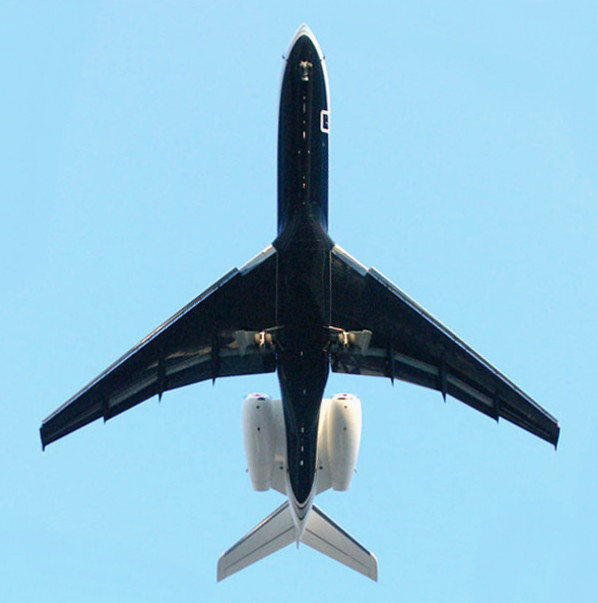
Bombardier Global Express showing rear fuselage thinning between engines

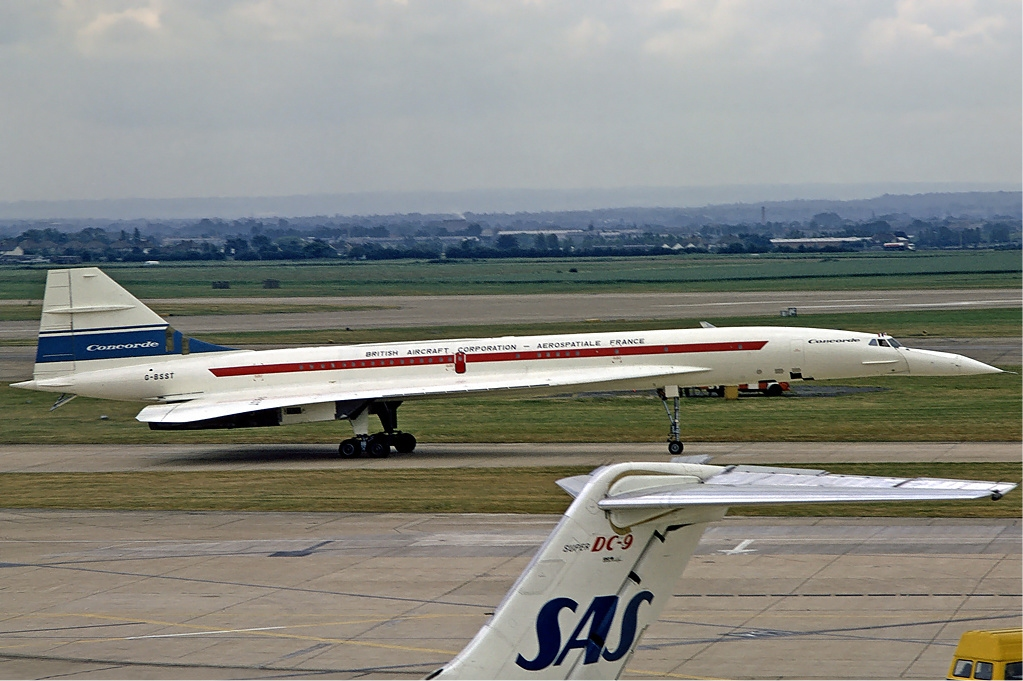
Prototype Concorde before tail was modified using Mach 2 application of area rule

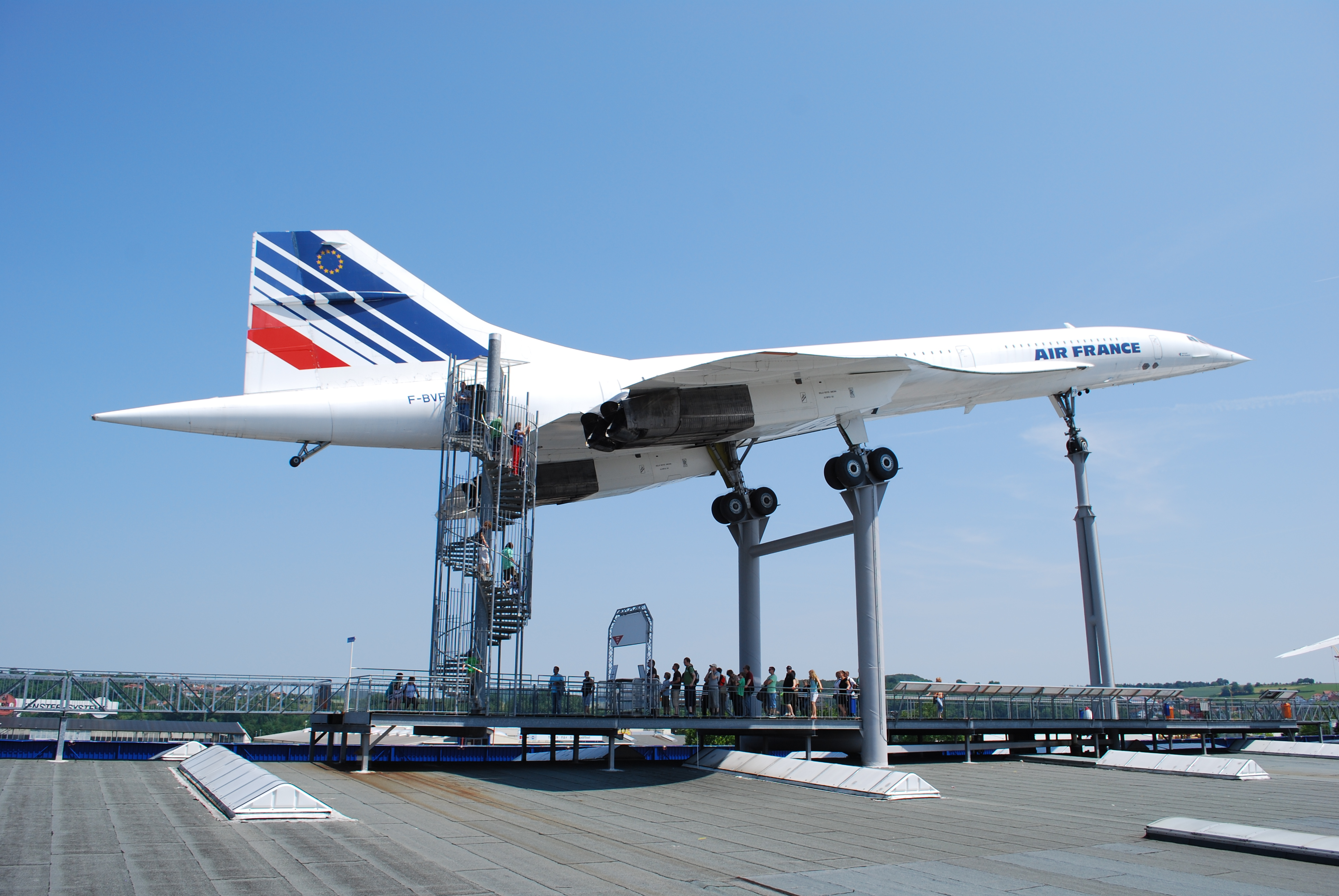
Production Concorde with area ruled tail

== See also ==
- Anti-shock body
- Coke bottle styling
- Sonic boom
- Sound barrier
- Supersonic aerodynamics

== Bibliography ==
- Wallace, Lane E (1998). "5". In Mack, Pamela E (ed.). The Whitcomb Area Rule: NACA Aerodynamics Research and Innovation. NASA. pp. 144–47.
