= Critical Mach number =

Concept in aerodynamics

Transonic flow patterns on an aircraft wing, showing the effects below and above the critical Mach number. Note that the top airfoil illustrates all speeds below the critical Mach number. It doesn't highlight reaching the critical Mach number by showing a point on the upper surface where the speed first becomes sonic (as is shown in published texts).

Airliners cruise at speeds just below the speed of sound. An important speed which the aircraft flies through just before reaching cruising speed occurs when the air flowing over the wing reaches the speed of sound. It is known as the critical Mach number (Mcr). Further increase in aircraft speed to the cruise value produces a region of supersonic flow which ends in a shock wave. Beyond the cruise speed, at the drag-divergence Mach number, the shock wave, and any attendant separated flow, produces too much drag for economical flight.

== Aircraft flight ==
In aircraft not designed to fly at or above the critical Mach number, the shock waves that form in the airflow over the wing and tailplane cause Mach tuck and may be sufficient to stall the wing, render the control surfaces ineffective, or lead to loss of control of the aircraft. These problematic phenomena appearing at or above the critical Mach number were eventually attributed to the compressibility of air. Compressibility led to a number of accidents involving high-speed military and experimental aircraft in the 1930s and 1940s.

The challenge of designing an aircraft to remain controllable approaching and reaching the speed of sound was the origin of the concept known as the sound barrier. 1940s-era military subsonic aircraft, such as the Supermarine Spitfire, Bf 109, P-51 Mustang, Gloster Meteor, He 162, and P-80, have relatively thick, unswept wings, and are incapable of reaching Mach 1.0 in controlled flight. In 1947, Chuck Yeager flew the Bell X-1 (also with an unswept wing, but a much thinner one), reaching Mach 1.06 and beyond, and the sound barrier was finally broken.

Early transonic military aircraft, such as the Hawker Hunter and F-86 Sabre, were designed to fly satisfactorily even at speeds greater than their critical Mach number. They did not possess sufficient engine thrust to reach Mach 1.0 in level flight, but could do so in a dive and remain controllable.

The actual critical Mach number varies from wing to wing. In general, a thicker wing will have a lower critical Mach number, because a thicker wing deflects the airflow passing around it more than a thinner wing does, and thus accelerates the airflow to a faster speed. For instance, the fairly-thick wing on the P-38 Lightning has a critical Mach number of about .69. The aircraft could occasionally reach this speed in dives, leading to a number of crashes. The Supermarine Spitfire's much thinner wing gave it a considerably higher critical Mach number (about 0.89).

== See also ==
- Mach number
- Drag divergence Mach number
