= Transonic =

Airflow above and below the speed of sound

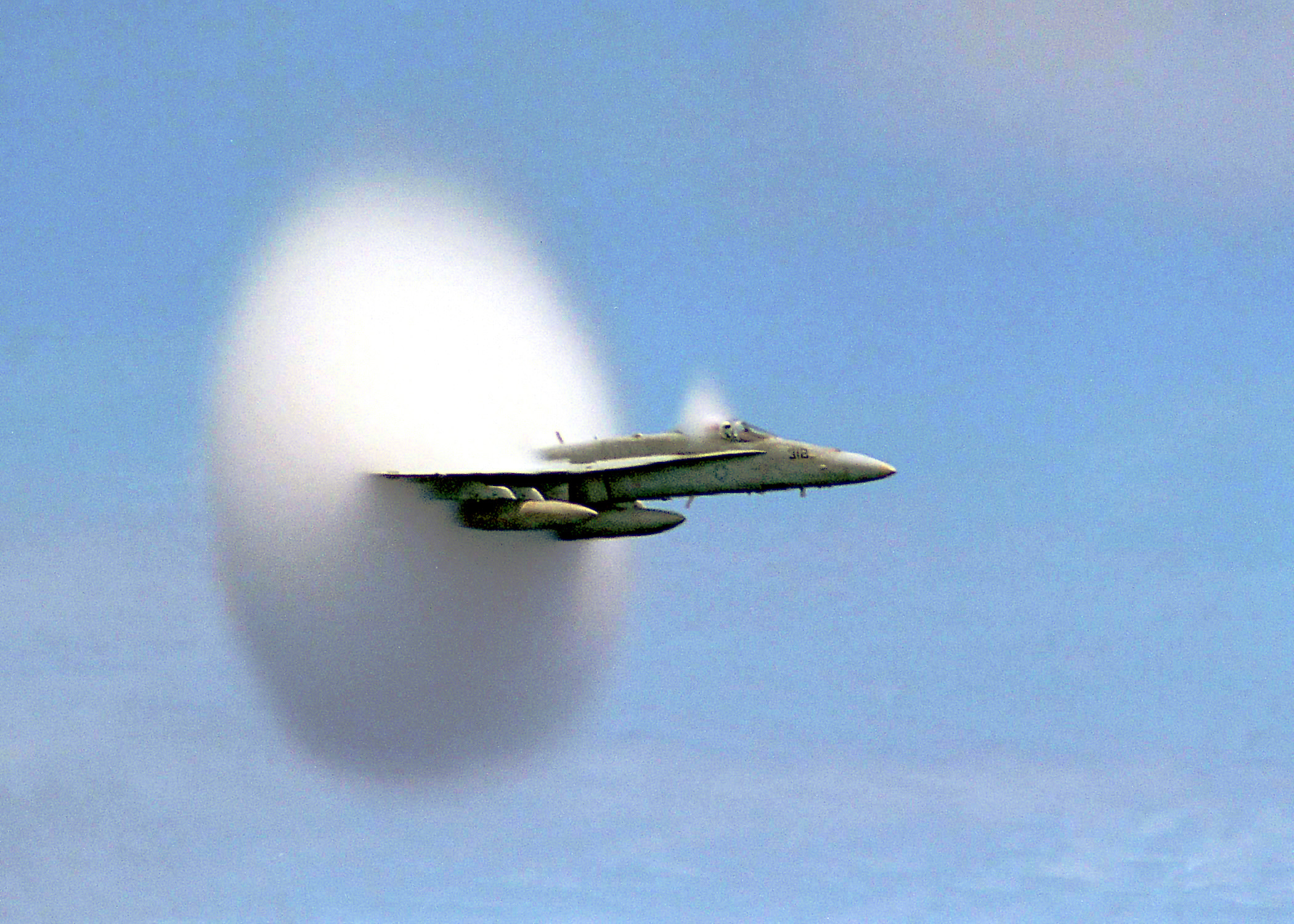
Aerodynamic condensation evidences of supersonic expansion fans around a transonic F/A-18

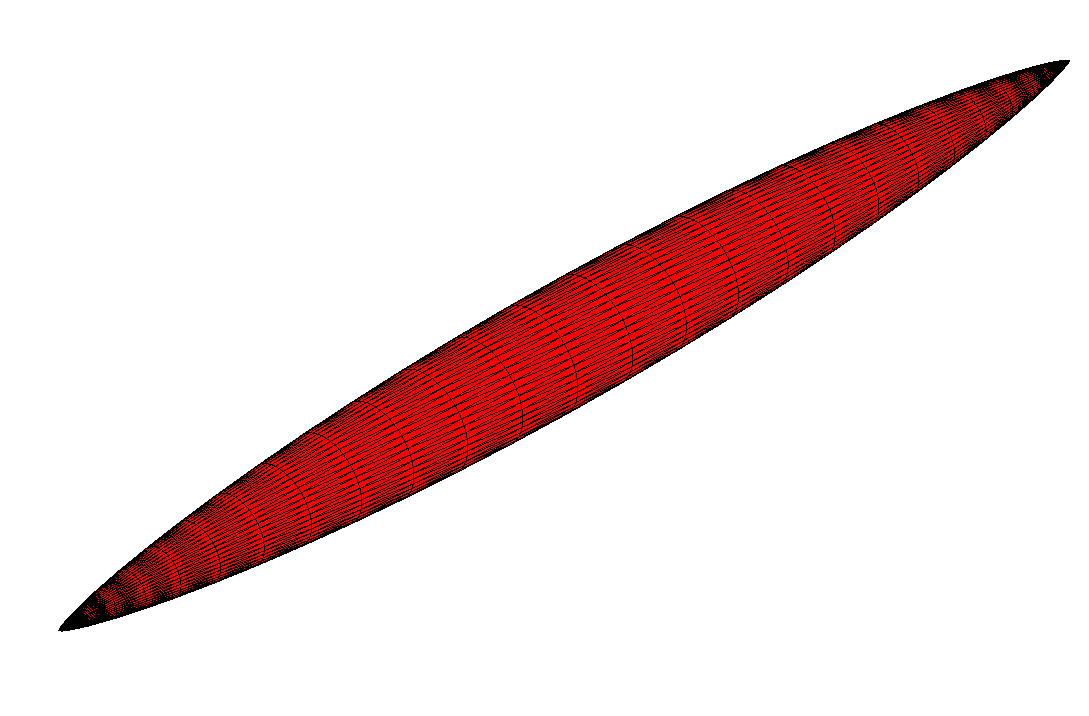
The Sears–Haack body presents a cross-sectional area variation which minimises wave drag.

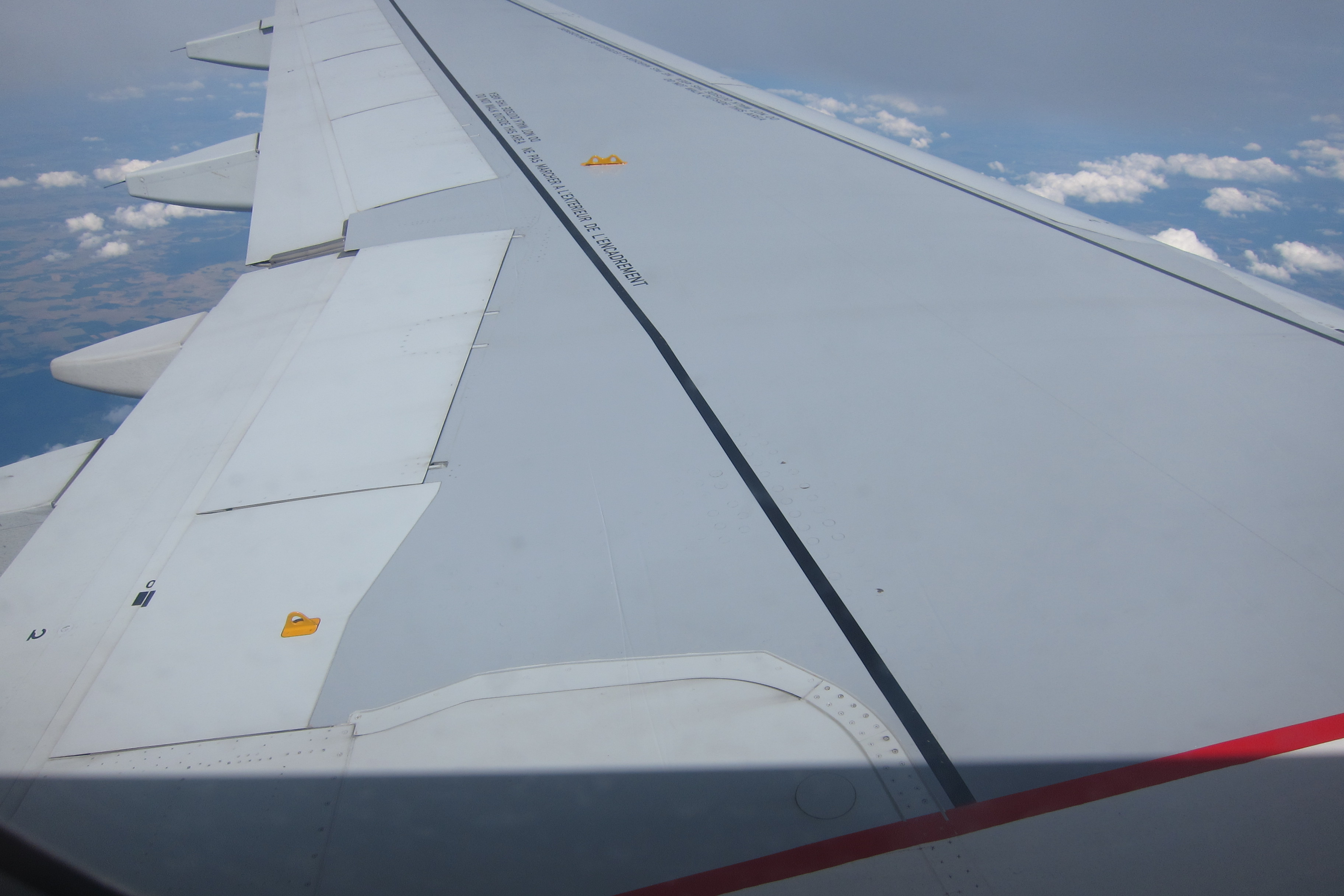
Shock waves might appear as weak optical disturbances above airliners with supercritical wings

Transonic flow patterns on an airfoil showing flow patterns at and above critical Mach number. Note that at the critical Mach number case shown the maximum local velocity is sonic ref image description

Transonic (or transsonic) flow is air flowing around an object at a speed that generates regions of both subsonic and supersonic airflow around that object. The exact range of speeds depends on the object's critical Mach number, but transonic flow is seen at flight speeds close to the speed of sound (343 m/s at sea level), typically between Mach 0.8 and 1.2.

The issue of transonic speed (or transonic region) first appeared during World War II. Pilots found as they approached the sound barrier the airflow caused aircraft to become unsteady. Experts found that shock waves can cause large-scale separation downstream, increasing drag, adding asymmetry and unsteadiness to the flow around the vehicle. Research has been done into weakening shock waves in transonic flight through the use of anti-shock bodies and supercritical airfoils.

Most modern jet powered aircraft are engineered to operate at transonic air speeds. Transonic airspeeds see a rapid increase in drag from about Mach 0.8, and it is the fuel cost of the drag that typically limits the airspeed. Attempts to reduce wave drag can be seen on all high-speed aircraft. Most notable is the use of swept wings.

== History ==
=== Discovering transonic airflow ===
In the 1940s, Kelly Johnson became one of the first engineers to investigate the effect of compressibility on aircraft. However, wind tunnels did not have the capability to create wind speeds close to Mach 1 to test the effects of transonic speeds. Not long after, the term "transonic" was defined to mean "across the speed of sound" and was invented by NACA director Hugh Dryden and Theodore von Kármán of the California Institute of Technology.

=== Changes in aircraft ===
NACA initially designed "dive flaps" to help stabilize the plane when reaching transonic flight. This small flap on the underside of the plane slowed the plane to prevent shock waves, but this design only delayed finding a solution to aircraft flying at supersonic speed. Newer wind tunnels were designed, so researchers could test more modern wing designs without risking test pilots' lives. The slotted-wall transonic tunnel was designed by NASA and allowed researchers to test wings and different airfoils in transonic airflow to find the best wingtip shape for sonic speeds.

After World War II, major changes in aircraft design were seen to improve transonic flight. The main way to stabilize an aircraft was to reduce the speed of the airflow around the wings by changing the chord of the plane wings, and one solution to prevent transonic waves was swept wings. Since the airflow would hit the wings at an angle, this would decrease the wing thickness and chord ratio. Airfoils' wing shapes were designed flatter at the top to stop shock waves and reduce the distance of airflow over the wing. Later on, Richard Whitcomb designed the first supercritical airfoil using similar principles.

=== Mathematical analysis ===
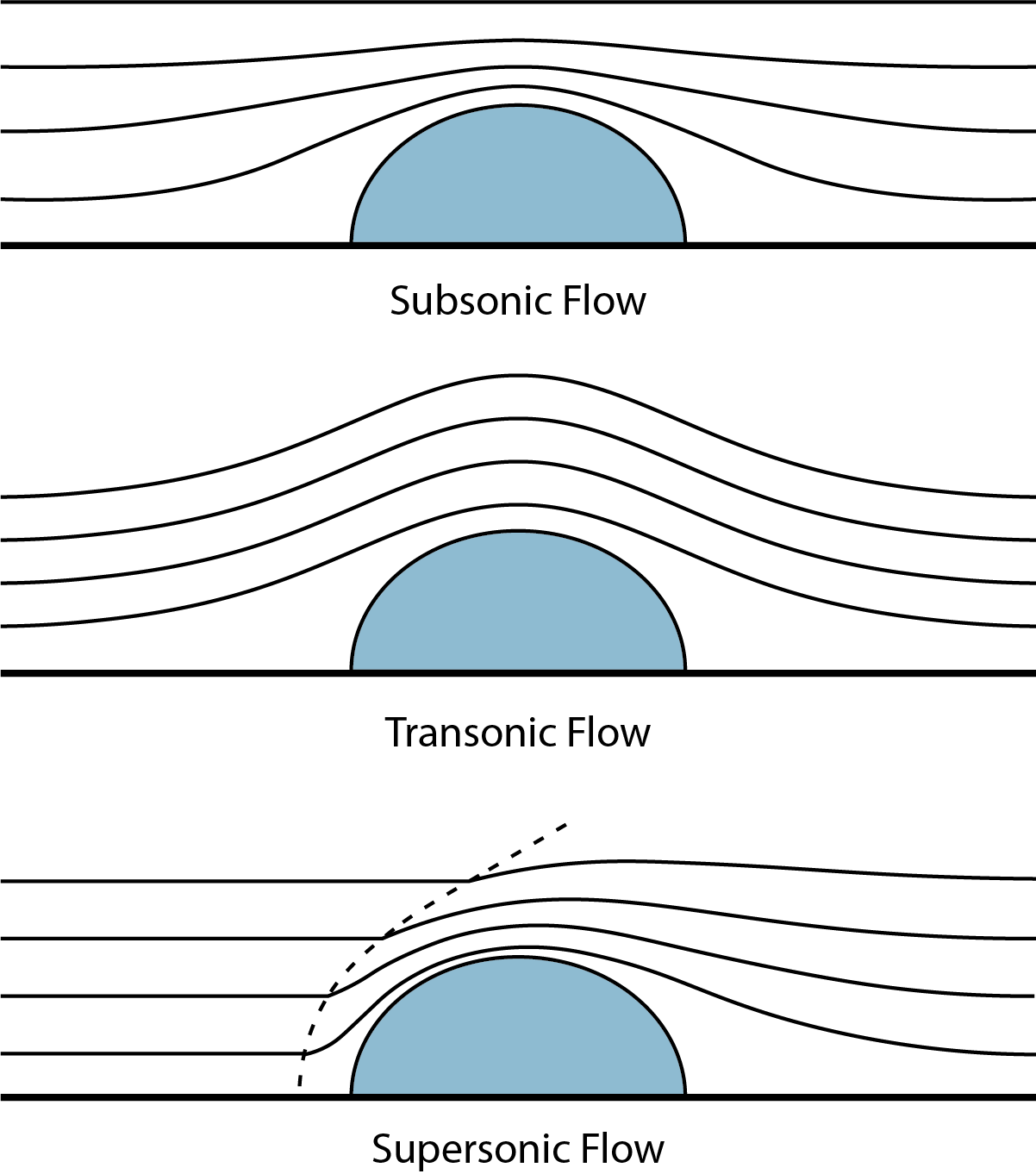
Streamlines for three airflow regimes (black lines) around a blunt body (blue).

Prior to the advent of powerful computers, even the simplest forms of the compressible flow equations were difficult to solve due to their nonlinearity. A common assumption used to circumvent this nonlinearity is that disturbances within the flow are relatively small, which allows mathematicians and engineers to linearize the compressible flow equations into a relatively easily solvable set of differential equations for either wholly subsonic or supersonic flows. This assumption is fundamentally untrue for transonic flows because the disturbance caused by an object is much larger than in subsonic or supersonic flows. A flow speed close to or at Mach 1 does not allow the streamtubes (3D flow paths) to contract enough around the object to minimize the disturbance, and thus the disturbance propagates. Aerodynamicists struggled during the earlier studies of transonic flow because the then-current theory implied that these disturbances– and thus drag– approached infinity as local Mach number approached 1, an unrealistic result which could not be remedied using known methods.

One of the first methods used to circumvent the nonlinearity of transonic flow models was the hodograph transformation. This concept was originally explored in 1923 by an Italian mathematician named Francesco Tricomi, who used the transformation to simplify the compressible flow equations and prove that they were solvable. The hodograph transformation itself was also explored by both Ludwig Prandtl and O.G. Tietjen's textbooks in 1929 and by Adolf Busemann in 1937, though neither applied this method specifically to transonic flow.

Gottfried Guderley, a German mathematician and engineer at Braunschweig, discovered Tricomi's work in the process of applying the hodograph method to transonic flow near the end of World War II. He focused on the nonlinear thin-airfoil compressible flow equations, the same as what Tricomi derived, though his goal of using these equations to solve flow over an airfoil presented unique challenges. Guderley and Hideo Yoshihara, along with some input from Busemann, later used a singular solution of Tricomi's equations to analytically solve the behavior of transonic flow over a double wedge airfoil, the first to do so with only the assumptions of thin-airfoil theory.

Although successful, Guderley's work was still focused on the theoretical, and only resulted in a single solution for a double wedge airfoil at Mach 1. Walter Vincenti, an American engineer at Ames Laboratory, aimed to supplement Guderley's Mach 1 work with numerical solutions that would cover the range of transonic speeds between Mach 1 and wholly supersonic flow. Vincenti and his assistants drew upon the work of Howard Emmons as well as Tricomi's original equations to complete a set of four numerical solutions for the drag over a double wedge airfoil in transonic flow above Mach 1. The gap between subsonic and Mach 1 flow was later covered by both Julian Cole and Leon Trilling, completing the transonic behavior of the airfoil by the early 1950s.

== Condensation clouds ==
At transonic speeds, supersonic expansion fans form intense low-pressure, low-temperature areas at various points around an aircraft. If the temperature decreases below the dew point, a visible cloud will form. These clouds remain with the aircraft as it travels. It is not necessary for the aircraft as a whole to reach supersonic speeds for these clouds to form. The tail of the aircraft will typically reach supersonic flight while the nose of the aircraft is still in subsonic flight. A bubble of supersonic expansion fans terminating by a wake shock wave surround the tail. While the aircraft continues to accelerate, the supersonic expansion fans will intensify and the wake shock wave will grow in size until infinity is reached, at which point the bow shock wave forms. This is Mach 1 and the Prandtl–Glauert singularity.

== Transonic flows in astronomy and astrophysics ==
In astrophysics, wherever there is evidence of shocks (standing, propagating or oscillating), the flow close by must be transonic, as only supersonic flows form shocks. All black hole accretions are transonic. Many such flows also have shocks very close to the black holes.

The outflows or jets from young stellar objects or disks around black holes can also be transonic since they start subsonically and at a far distance they are invariably supersonic. Supernovae explosions are accompanied by supersonic flows and shock waves. Bow shocks formed in stellar winds are a direct result of transonic winds from a star. It had been long thought that a bow shock was present around the heliosphere of the Solar System, but this was found not to be the case according to IBEX data published in 2012.

== See also ==
- Anti-shock body
- Subsonic flows
- Supersonic flows
- Hypersonic flows
- Supersonic expansion fans
