= Dietrich Küchemann =

German aerodynamicist

Dietrich Küchemann CBE FRS
- Born: 11 September 1911; Göttingen, Province of Hanover, Prussia, German Empire
- Died: 23 February 1976 (aged 64); Farnham, England
- Occupation: Aerodynamicist

Dietrich Küchemann CBE FRS FRAeS (11 September 1911 – 23 February 1976) was a German aerodynamicist who made several important contributions to the advancement of high-speed flight. He spent most of his career in the UK, where he is best known for his work on Concorde.

== Biography ==
Küchemann was born in Göttingen where he studied at its University of Göttingen, home of the largest German institute of aerodynamics. He was originally going to move on to pure physics research under Max Born, a friend of his father's, but lost this chance when Born and several other Jewish members of the University staff were expelled from the country by the Nazi regime. Instead Küchemann went on to join Ludwig Prandtl in aerodynamics research. He published his doctoral thesis in 1936.

With the war looming, Küchemann volunteered for service in 1938, and as expected was given a non-combatant role in Signals. He held the rank of Unteroffizier from 1942 to 1945, but he saw no active service. During this period he continued research, notably into the problems of high speed flight, wave drag, swept wing theory and initial steps on the road to the area rule, and he designed a fuselage shape later dubbed the "Küchemann Coke Bottle".

One year after the war Küchemann moved to England and started work at the Royal Aircraft Establishment (RAE) at Farnborough. In 1953 he and his colleague, Johanna Weber, published the still-standard work on the topic, Aerodynamics of Propulsion, based on their work at the Aeronautische Versuchsanstalt (AVA), Göttingen from 1940 to 1945.

Küchemann continued his work on high-speed flight, and was part of the team involved in the development of the delta wing in England. He raised the design as a possible approach for supersonic transport, but indicated that he was unclear about the low speed controllability. A series of test aircraft, such as Handley Page HP.115, were built during the 1950s to study the various problems with the design, which eventually led to the advanced ogive shape used on Concorde. He was also a tireless promoter of the lifting body concept for aircraft (as opposed to spacecraft, as in US research), although to date no blended wing body aircraft has entered service. Similar research was followed on the waverider concept.

After becoming – along with Weber – a British citizen in 1953, the following year he was promoted to the Senior Principal Scientific Officer (SPSO) at the RAE, in 1957 the deputy chief scientific officer (DCSO) and head of the Supersonics Division, and finally the chief scientific officer (CSO) and head of the entire Aerodynamics Department in 1966. He retired from administrative duties in 1971, but continued work on an effort to build a very large supersonic wind tunnel for use by various European research departments, but this was not completed in his lifetime.

With the help of colleagues at the RAE and Imperial College London his book The Aerodynamic Design of Aircraft was published two years after his death, and is considered by many to be the classic text on modern aerodynamics.

In 1962 he was awarded the Royal Aeronautical Society's Silver Medal, and in 1963 he was elected a Fellow of the Royal Society. In 1964 Küchemann was appointed a Commander of the Most Excellent Order of the British Empire. He was awarded the Ludwig-Prandtl-Ring from the Deutsche Gesellschaft für Luft- und Raumfahrt (German Society for Aeronautics and Astronautics) for "outstanding contribution in the field of aerospace engineering" in 1970.

His name has entered aeronautical lore in the form of the trailing edge anti-shock bodies used on the Handley Page Victor bomber, commonly referred to as "Küchemann carrots".

An amateur cellist, he joined the Farnborough Symphony Orchestra in 1946. He became principal cello and remained with the orchestra until 1971.

== Books and publications ==
- Küchemann, Dietrich (1938). "Störungsbewegungen in einer Gasströmung mit Grenzschicht". Zeitschrift für Angewandte Mathematik und Mechanik (in German). 18 (4): 207–222. Bibcode:1938ZaMM...18..207K. doi:10.1002/zamm.19380180402.
- Küchemann, Dietrich; Weber, Johanna (1953). Aerodynamics of Propulsion. McGraw-Hill publications in aeronautical science (1 ed.). New York, NY: McGraw Hill.
- Küchemann, Dietrich (1978). The Aerodynamic Design of Aircraft. Pergamon international library of science, technology, engineering, and social studies (1 ed.). Oxford: Pergamon Press. ISBN 0-08-020515-1.
- Küchemann, Dietrich (2012) [1978]. The Aerodynamic Design of Aircraft. AIAA Education Series. Reston, VA: American Institute of Aeronautics & Astronautics. ISBN 978-1-60086-922-8.

== See also ==
- Concorde
- Supersonic flight
- Wave drag
- Area rule
