= Egbert Torenbeek =

Dutch aircraft designer (1939–2024)

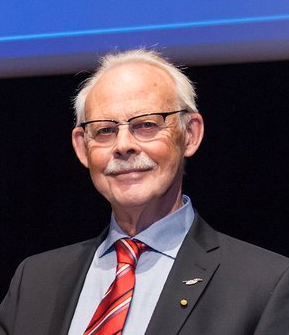
- Egbert Torenbeek, 2016
- Born: March 26, 1939
- Died: August 29, 2024 (aged 85)
- Education: Delft University of Technology
- Awards: Ludwig Prandtl Ring
- Scientific career
- Fields: Aircraft Design
- Workplaces: Delft University of Technology
- Doctoral advisor: Hans Wittenberg

Egbert Torenbeek (26 March 1939 – 29 August 2024) was a Dutch professor emeritus in the Department of Aerodynamics, Wind Energy, Flight Performance & Propulsion (AWEP) at Delft University of Technology. He is known for his contributions to Aircraft Design, especially his book Synthesis of Subsonic Airplane Design, published in 1976. This standard work was also translated into Russian and Chinese.

== Career ==
Egbert Torenbeek studied at Delft Institute of Technology from 1956 to 1961 and graduated with a degree in aeronautical engineering. Afterwards in 1961 he took the "Guided Missiles Course" at College of Aeronautics in Cranfield, England, which was followed by his military service from 1962 to 1963 in the Netherlands. He returned to Delft Institute of Technology in 1963 to start work under Hans Wittenberg, professor of aircraft design.

Torenbeek had to supervise a laboratory course and found that there was no up-to-date handbook on aircraft design. So he collected information on designing aeroplanes that had been published up until 1970. This was when jet planes like the DC-8 and the Boeing 707 were already operational and Concorde had already had its first flight. Therefore, one of the challenges was gathering the latest information on aircraft design. Finally, after about five years of work, supported also by university employees, the book Synthesis of Subsonic Aircraft Design was published by Delft University Press in 1976. In 1977 a sabbatical at Lockheed Georgia, USA followed. Torenbeek became full professor of aircraft design at Delft University of Technology in 1980.

In 1993 he participated in the design of the Extra 400: "The airframe was designed with engineering help from the Technical University of Delft in Holland under leadership from Prof. Egbert Torenbeek". LBA Type Certificate Date was obtained on 22 July 1997.

The first European Workshop on Aircraft Design Education (EWADE) was held in Madrid in 1994, of which Torenbeek was a co-founder. The journal "Aircraft Design" (ISSN 1369-8869) was started with Elsevier in 1998. Torenbeek acted as Editor in Chief together with Prof. Dr. Jan Roskam. Torenbeek served as vice-rector of Delft University from 1998 to 2000, which was followed by his retirement. His early retirement was related to political decisions at Delft University in the wake of Fokker's bankruptcy. Torenbeek continued as professor emeritus.

The book Flight Physics (co-authored with Hans Wittenberg) was published by Springer in 2009. The books Advanced Aircraft Design and Essentials of Supersonic Commercial Aircraft Conceptual Design were published by Wiley in 2013 and 2020, respectively. Torenbeek served from 2020 to 2022 as Honorary Guest Editor for the continuous Special Issue "Aircraft Design" at the journal Aerospace (ISSN 2226-4310) together with Guest Editor Prof. Dr. Dieter Scholz.

Professor Torenbeek received the 58th Ludwig Prandtl Ring (2016) "in recognition of his outstanding scientific achievements in the field of aircraft design in teaching, research and application" from the German Society for Aeronautics and Astronautics.

Torenbeek died on 29 August 2024, at the age of 85.

== Books ==
- Torenbeek, Egbert (1982). Synthesis of Subsonic Airplane Design. Netherlands: Springer. p. 598. doi:10.1007/978-94-017-3202-4. ISBN 978-90-247-2724-7.
- Torenbeek, Egbert; Wittenberg, Hans (2009). Flight Physics. Netherlands: Springer. p. 537. doi:10.1007/978-1-4020-8664-9. ISBN 978-1-4020-8663-2.
- Torenbeek, Egbert (2013). Advanced Aircraft Design: Conceptual Design, Analysis and Optimization of Subsonic Civil Airplanes. Hoboken, New Jersey: John Wiley & Sons. p. 436. doi:10.1002/9781118568101. ISBN 978-1-118-56811-8.
- Torenbeek, Egbert (2020). Essentials of Supersonic Commercial Aircraft Conceptual Design. Hoboken, New Jersey: John Wiley & Sons. p. 184. doi:10.1002/9781119667063. ISBN 978-1-119-66700-1. S2CID 219908222.

== Honors and awards ==
- 2000: Honorary doctorate from the Moscow Aviation Institute. Torenbeek sent his honorary doctorate back to Moscow as an act of protest immediately after the MH17 disaster in 2014.
- 2013: Design Award from the American Institute of Aeronautics and Astronautics (AIAA). The Aircraft Design Award was established in 1968 and is presented to an individual or team for an original concept or career contributions leading to a significant advancement in aircraft design or design technology.
- 2016: Ludwig Prandtl Ring. The Ludwig Prandtl Ring from German Society for Aeronautics and Astronautics. It is awarded "for outstanding contribution in the field of aerospace engineering". The award is named in honour of Ludwig Prandtl.

== (Past) Memberships ==
- Engineering Sciences Data Unit (ESDU)
- Programme Committee of the International Council of the Aeronautical Sciences
