= Jean-Paul Béchat =

French businessman

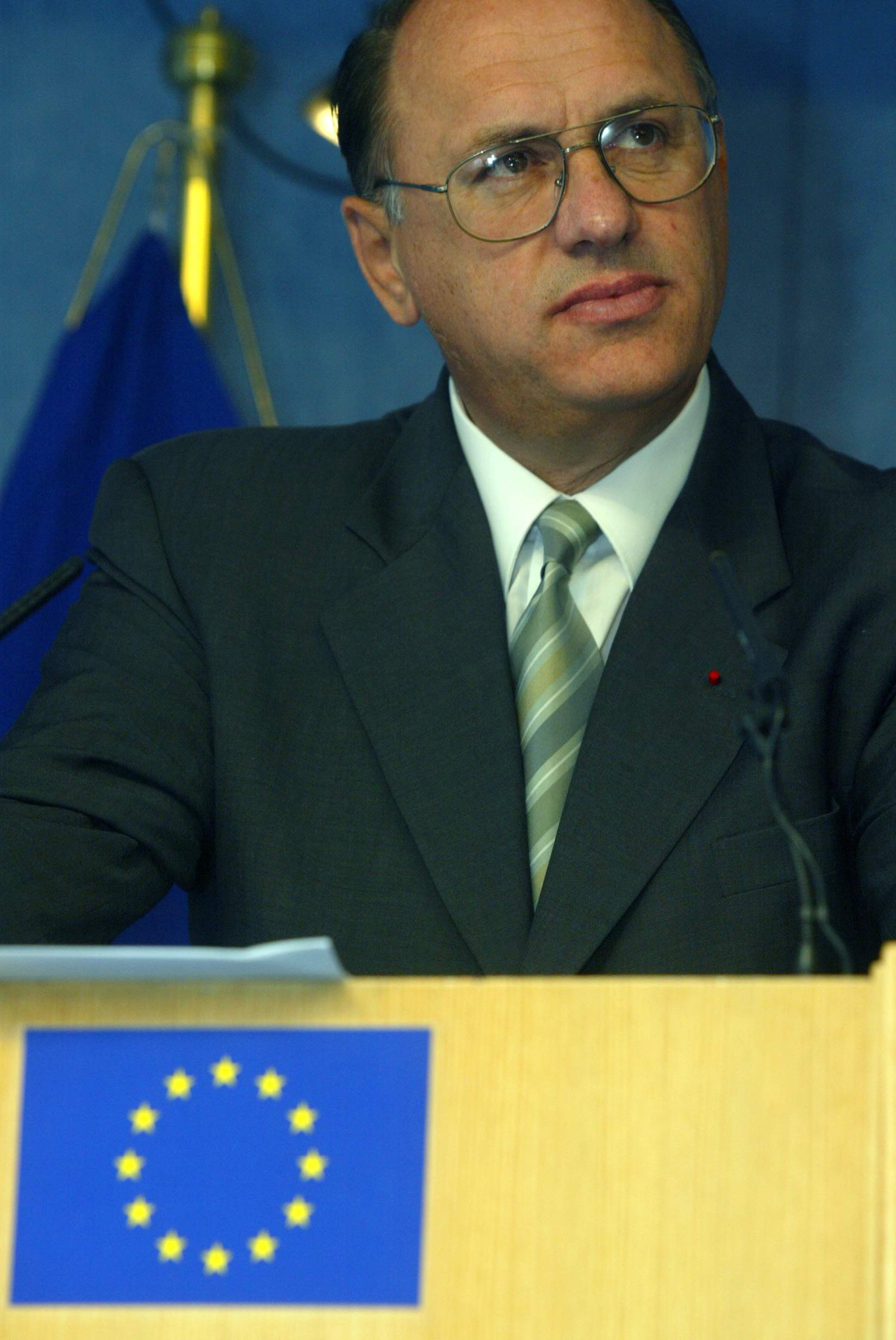
- Born: 2 September 1942; Montlhéry, France
- Died: 22 November 2014 (aged 72); Paris, France
- Education: École Polytechnique; Stanford University
- Occupation: Businessman

Jean-Paul Béchat (September 2, 1942 – November 22, 2014) was a French engineer. He was the CEO of Snecma then Safran until 2007.

== Biography ==
=== Early life ===
Béchat was born in Montlhery, France. He held an engineering degree from the École Polytechnique and a Master of Science from Stanford University.

=== Career ===
Béchat started career at Snecma in 1965 as a production engineer, where he spent the main part of his career. At the company he later became director of production during 1974-1978, managing director of Industrial Affairs between 1979-1981, then Assistant General Manager of the reactor power management subsidiary, Hispano-Suiza between 1982-1985. In 1986 he became General Manager then CEO of Messier-Hispano-Bugatti, later creating Messier-Dowty in 1994.

Béchat was CEO of Snecma SA From June 4, 1996 to March 2005. Béchat oversaw the merger of Snecma and the defense-electronics maker Sagem, in 2005, to form Safran, Europe’s second largest engine maker . He ran the company as CEO between 2005 and 2007.

=== Board Memberships ===
- Chairman of AECMA since October 2001
- Honorary Chairman and Member of the Board of ASD since May 2005
- Independent Director at Alstom Power AG and Alstom Deutschland GmbH since May 14, 2001 until July 2013
- Director of GIFAS since 2009
- Board Member of the IMS International Metal Service until 2010
- Board Member of Aéroports de Paris 2004-2005
- Board Member of France Telecom SA 1998-2003
- Independent Director of Alstom Finland Oy since July 9, 2004
- Independent Director of Atos SE since 2009
- Independent Non-Executive Director at Russian Helicopters JSC since 2011
- Chairman of the Board and CEO of PowerJet
- Member of the Advisory Board of Banque de France
- Member of the Advisory Board of the General Board of Weaponry
- Member of the Advisory Board of the MEDEF Executive Committee
- Member of the Advisory Board and Director of SOGEPA
- Director of Messier-Dowty International

== Awards ==
- Commander of the Ordre national de la Légion d'honneur
- Officer of the National Order of Merit (France).
- Commander of the Order of Ouissam Alaouite;
- Honorary Fellow of the Royal Aeronautical Society;
- Member of the Association Aéronautique et Astronautique de France (AAAF);
- Member of the International Academy of Astronautics (IAA).
- Gold medal of C.E.A.S. (Council of European Aerospace Societies)

=== Other Affiliations ===
Bechat also held the positions of a member of the UIMM, Board Member of the Musée de l'air et de l'espace, and member of the ASD council, in addition to having been a member of the Economic Council of Defense and the General Council of Armaments.
