= Mary Sudbury =

British female supersonic engineer and charity worker

- Born: 1934; Eccles, Manchester
- Died: 7 January 2018 (aged 83–84)
- Education: Pendleton High School and Westfield College University of London
- Occupation: engineer
- Employer: Royal Aircraft Establishment
- Known for: wind tunnel engineering for supersonic aircraft Concorde

Mary Sudbury (1934 - 7 January 2018) was an engineer who worked in the 1950s wind tunnel research team, developing the supersonic airliner, Concorde, and was an Edinburgh Christian charity worker.

== Life and work ==
Born Mary Johnson, in 1934 in Eccles, Manchester; her father Thomas was an Agecroft colliery worker and mother Winifred (née Warrington) was an elocution teacher and comedy actor. Sudbury grew up with air raids, city smog, and meeting German POWs and had a brother, Peter. She attended Pendleton High School, did not enjoy art classes, but she played hockey for the county. Her education continued at Westfield College, University of London where she graduated in mathematics in 1954.

=== Engineering role ===
Sudbury immediately joined the Royal Aircraft Establishment, Farnborough, Hampshire (RAE). She worked in the wind tunnels engineering team. The innovative buildings were precision engineered and at the forefront of aviation research, to test the impact of airflow on an object such as an aircraft, and thus required complex calculations before the development of computers. One wind tunnel was specifically designed to test supersonic aircraft, up to Mach 1.2, part of Concorde development project, and is now a listed building.

Developing the shape of the supersonic aircraft was a 'staggeringly bold aerodynamic adventure'. The models of the tunnel development are held in the Science Museum. A video of the output (after Sudbury's time as it refers to punchcards) shows the complexity of the building and the data she had to work with.

In 1959 she married George Sudbury. But as the only female on the wind tunnel engineering testing team, despite earlier female pioneers like Frances Bradfield, and contemporary German scientist Johanna Weber at RAE, Sudbury became frustrated at being asked by a new manager for example, to 'pour the coffee' at visitor meetings. Sudbury left RAE upon the birth of her first child.

=== Charity work ===
Moving to Edinburgh in 1962, when her husband was employed by the Royal Observatory, she had two further children. They also adopted two mixed-race children. This decision led to estrangement from her father.

Sudbury worked as a maths teacher and established a charity which helped disabled adults into further education. An active member of the Scottish Episcopal Church, Sudbury had left during a sermon which preached that there may be some benefit in nuclear weapons, and joined the pacifist Society of Friends (Quaker) religion. Her charity work included creating a rent guarantee scheme, housing refugees, reading to a blind person, and supporting ex-prisoners to re-enter society upon release.

In her latter years, Sudbury suffered from dementia but retained her sense of humour. She died on 7 January 2018, and is survived by her children Marion, Peter, Mark and Chinyere and her seven grandchildren.

== See also ==
- supersonic transport for a discussion of aerodynamics being tested
- Royal Aircraft Establishment for information about the wind tunnels
