= Hans Georg Küssner =

German physicist and aerospace engineer (1900–1984)

Hans Georg Küssner (14 September 1900 – 21 March 1984) was a German physicist and aeronautical scientist known for his work in the field of aeroelasticity.

== Work ==
Hans Georg Küssner was born on 14 September 1900 in Bartenstein, then part of the East Prussian district of Friedland in the German Reich. Küssner studied at the Technical University of the Free City of Danzig (now Gdańsk University of Technology) and received his doctorate in 1928 with his dissertation "Das wirtschaftliche Ozeanflugzeug" under Viktor Rembold. In the same year he moved to the German Research Institute for Aviation in Berlin, where he worked on the aircraft problem of flutter, which was reflected in a large number of publications.

In 1934, Küssner moved to the Aerodynamics Research Institute in Göttingen. In 1936 he formulated the Küssner function to describe the unsteady effect on wings caused by turbulence. In 1939, Küssner was appointed head of the "Institute for Transient Processes". Here he achieved his scientific breakthrough in 1940 with his General Wing Theory — the integral equation for oscillating three-dimensional wing systems in subsonic flow. For his work, Küssner was appointed professor and corresponding member of the German Academy of Aviation Research. The computationally expensive numerical solution of the equation was an application field of Konrad Zuse's Z3 computer, which could drastically reduce the time required.

After the Second World War, Küssner joined the Max Planck Institute for Flow Research in Göttingen in 1947, where he turned to theoretical physics and continuum mechanics. In 1957, Küssner again moved to the Aerodynamics Research Institute, where he became head of the department for aeroelasticity. Due to Küssner's international reputation, he became a member of the committee for structures and materials of the NATO agency AGARD (Advisory Group for Aerospace Research and Development). In 1968 he became a member of the International Academy of Astronautics and in 1981 he was awarded the Ludwig-Prandtl-Ring by the German Society for Aeronautics and Astronautics.

== Personal life ==
Hans Georg Küssner married Martha Petter.

Küssner died on 21 March 1984 in Kassel.
