= HAES =

HAES may refer to:

- Hellenic Aeronautical Engineers Society
- Health at Every Size
- Hydroxyethyl starch (HES/HAES)
