= Raymond L. Bisplinghoff =

American aeronautical engineer and academic administrator (1917–1985)

- Born: Raymond Lewis Bisplinghoff; February 7, 1917; Hamilton, Ohio, U.S.
- Died: March 5, 1985 (aged 68); Boston, Massachusetts, U.S.
- Education: University of Cincinnati; Swiss Federal Institute of Technology
- Known for: Work on aeroelasticity and aircraft structural dynamics
- Notable work: Aeroelasticity
- Spouse: Ruth Doherty
- Awards: Member, National Academy of Engineering; Member, National Academy of Sciences; Fellow, American Academy of Arts and Sciences
- Scientific career
- Fields: Aerospace engineering Aeroelasticity; Structural dynamics
- Workplaces: Massachusetts Institute of Technology; NASA; National Science Foundation; University of Missouri–Rolla; Tyco Laboratories

Raymond Lewis Bisplinghoff (February 7, 1917 – March 5, 1985) was an American aeronautical engineer, educator, academic administrator, and government official. He was a professor and dean of engineering at the Massachusetts Institute of Technology, an administrator at NASA and the National Science Foundation, and president of the International Council of the Aeronautical Sciences. He was known for work in aeroelasticity, aircraft structures, and structural dynamics.

== Early life and education ==
Bisplinghoff was born February 7, 1917, in Hamilton, Ohio, the son of a flour mill proprietor. He attended the University of Cincinnati for seven years, earning an aeronautical engineering degree (1940) and a master’s degree in physics (1942). He then worked for two and a half years in a student cooperative program at Aeronca Aircraft Corporation, where he worked on stress analysis, design, aerodynamics, and flight testing. His pursuit of a Ph.D. in physics at the University of Cincinnati was interrupted by World War II. He later completed doctoral studies and received a Ph.D. from the Swiss Federal Institute of Technology in 1957.

== World War II service ==
During World War II, Bisplinghoff worked at the U.S. Army Air Corps’ Wright Field on aircraft flutter and engine vibration. He served for three years as a naval officer assigned to the Bureau of Aeronautics in Washington, D.C., and during this time, he worked on aircraft structures, loads, and dynamics.

== Career ==
After World War II, Bisplinghoff joined MIT as an assistant professor in aeronautical engineering. He served at MIT for sixteen years: two years as an assistant professor, four years as an associate professor, and ten years as a full professor, working on teaching, research, writing, and departmental management in aeronautical engineering. Bisplinghoff founded MIT’s Aeroelastic and Structures Research Laboratory.

Bisplinghoff took leave from MIT in 1962 for a four-year term as an assistant administrator of NASA, during which time he led NASA’s program in advanced research and technology. He later served as special assistant to NASA administrator James E. Webb.

Bisplinghoff returned to MIT after NASA service and succeeded Charles Stark Draper as head of the Department of Aeronautics and Astronautics. After his return to MIT, Bisplinghoff maintained close ties to NASA during the Apollo period; he was involved in planning for Apollo missions 8, 9, 10, 11, and 12.

Bisplinghoff served as the dean of the MIT School of Engineering from 1968 to 1970.

In 1970, Bisplinghoff went to the National Science Foundation where he served as deputy director from 1970 to 1974, working under NSF directors William McElroy and Guyford Stever. Bisplinghoff helped strengthen the NSF engineering programs and establish the RANN program, Research Applied to National Needs, an experimental program created to address pressing domestic issues that was a precursor to applied research directorates within NSF. Via the RANN program, he helped expand NSF work in solar and renewable energy before that program was later transferred to the Energy Research and Development Agency.

In 1974, Bisplinghoff became chancellor of the University of Missouri–Rolla. Then in 1977, he became a director and vice president for research at Tyco Laboratories, where he directed research and development efforts, including work in solar energy materials. He retired from Tyco Laboratories in 1984.

== Research and writing ==
Bisplinghoff authored and coauthored research papers and textbooks in aeroelasticity, aircraft structures, and structural dynamics. He worked on flutter and dynamic response, including gust loading of aircraft wings.

With Guyford Stever, he conducted a three-year research program on effects of nuclear blasts on flying aircraft; the work included participation in the Eniwetok Atoll tests in 1951 and 1952.

With colleagues and former students, Bisplinghoff coauthored three textbooks:

- Aeroelasticity with Holt Ashley and Robert L. Halfman.
- Principles of Aeroelasticity with Holt Ashley.
- Statics of Deformable Solids with James W. Mar and Theodore H. H. Pian.

The ICAS memorial described Aeroelasticity as a widely recognized text in the field.

== Professional service ==
- Chairman of the Scientific Advisory Board of the U.S. Air Force from 1979 to 1982.
- Chief Scientific Adviser to the Federal Aviation Administration.
- President of the International Council of the Aeronautical Sciences (ICAS) from 1978 to 1982.
- Chairman of the ICAS Executive Committee from 1972 to 1978.

== Honors and awards ==
- Elected to the American Academy of Arts and Sciences in 1957.
- Elected to the National Academy of Engineering in 1965.
- Elected to the National Academy of Sciences in 1967.
- Honorary fellow of the Royal Aeronautical Society.
- Received the U.S. Air Force Exceptional Civilian Service Medal.
- Received the National Science Foundation Distinguished Service Award.
- Received the Federal Aviation Administration Extraordinary Service Medal.
- Received the NASA Distinguished Service Medal.
- Received an honorary doctorate from the University of Cincinnati.

== Personal life ==
During his wartime service, Bisplinghoff married Ruth Doherty of Cincinnati; they had two sons, Ross and Ron.

== Selected works ==
- Bisplinghoff, Raymond L.; Ashley, Holt; Halfman, Robert L. (1955). Aeroelasticity. Addison-Wesley.
- Bisplinghoff, Raymond L.; Ashley, Holt (1961). Principles of Aeroelasticity. John Wiley & Sons.
- Bisplinghoff, Raymond L.; Mar, James W. (1965). Statics of Deformable Solids. Addison-Wesley.
