= International Council of the Aeronautical Sciences =

International non-government organization

The International Council of the Aeronautical Sciences (ICAS) is a worldwide institution, established as an international forum for individual national aeronautical professional associations.

== History ==
It was formed on 29 January 1957 at a conference in the US. The first ICAS Congress was held in Spain in 1958. Frank Wattendorf, of AGARD, was the first Director.

A second meeting was held in Paris, with Hugh Latimer Dryden of the National Advisory Committee for Aeronautics, and representatives from ONERA (Office National d'Etudes et de Recherches Aérospatiales), the Royal Aeronautical Society (RAeS), the WGL (now the Deutsche Gesellschaft für Luft- und Raumfahrt), the Association Française des Ingénieurs et Techniciens de l'Aéronautique (now the Association Aéronautique et Astronautique de France), and the Aeronautical Research Institute of Sweden.

=== Congresses ===
ICAS holds an international congress every two years. The congresses are listed below by number, year, and location.

No.	Year	Location	No.	Year	Location
1	1958	Madrid, Spain	19	1994	Anaheim, United States
2	1960	Zurich, Switzerland	20	1996	Sorrento, Italy
3	1962	Stockholm, Sweden	21	1998	Melbourne, Australia
4	1964	Paris, France	22	2000	Harrogate, United Kingdom
5	1966	London, United Kingdom	23	2002	Toronto, Canada
6	1968	Munich, Germany	24	2004	Yokohama, Japan
7	1970	Rome, Italy	25	2006	Hamburg, Germany
8	1972	Amsterdam, Netherlands	26	2008	Anchorage, United States
9	1974	Haifa, Israel	27	2010	Nice, France
10	1976	Ottawa, Canada	28	2012	Brisbane, Australia
11	1978	Lisbon, Portugal	29	2014	St Petersburg, Russia
12	1980	Munich, Germany	30	2016	Daejeon, South Korea
13	1982	Seattle, United States	31	2018	Belo Horizonte, Brazil
14	1984	Toulouse, France	32	2021	Shanghai, China
15	1986	London, United Kingdom	33	2022	Stockholm, Sweden
16	1988	Jerusalem, Israel	34	2024	Florence, Italy
17	1990	Stockholm, Sweden	35	2026	Sydney, Australia
18	1992	Beijing, China			

=== Presidents ===
- Raymond L. Bisplinghoff 1978
- Boris Laschka 1986
- Paolo Santini 1990
- Murray Scott 2013
- Christian Mari 2015
- Susan Ying 2017
- Shinji Suzuki 2017
- Dimitri Mavris 2023

== Structure ==
The secretariat of ICAS is at Deutsche Gesellschaft für Luft- und Raumfahrt (DLR) in Bonn. It was first headquartered at the American Institute of Aeronautics and Astronautics (AIAA), the DLR from 1978, the RAeS in 1986, the Nederlandse Vereniging voor Luchtvaarttechniek from 1990, the AAAF (Association Aéronautique et Astronautique de France) from 1997, then Sweden from 2002, and Germany from January 2011.

== See also ==
- Council of European Aerospace Societies (CEAS)
- Fédération Aéronautique Internationale (FAI)
- International Astronautical Federation
