= 3AF =

3AF may refer to:

- Association Aéronautique et Astronautique de France, French national aeronautical and astronautical association
- Third Air Force, part of the US Air Force
