= Hellenic Aeronautical Engineers Society =

Engineering organization of Greece

The Hellenic Aeronautical Engineers Society (HAES; Greek: Σύλλογος Ελλήνων Αεροναυπηγών) is the society of professional licensed Aeronautical Engineers in Greece.

The purpose of HAES is to provide a basis where Greek-licensed Aeronautical Engineers can fraternize and coordinate scientific and professional efforts to assist the state and support, develop, and promote aviation and space activities.

HAES was first registered in 1975 as a society (noncommercial) and it is a branch organization of the Hellenic Technical (Engineering) Chambers (Τεχνικό Επιμελητήριο Ελλάδας) in Greece. The Society is a member and the national representative of the International Council of the Aeronautical Sciences (ICAS), the Council of European Aerospace Societies (CEAS), and the European Federation of National Engineering Associations (FEANI).

The society numbers approximately 250 members, almost all having university degrees in Aeronautical Engineering from countries outside Greece (mostly the United Kingdom, Italy, Germany, France, and the United States) due to the practically non-existence of such academic programs in Greece until recently.

The main requirement for one to become a member is to have a Professional License in Aeronautical Engineering from the Hellenic Technical Chambers in Greece and be in good standing with the chamber.
