= Kerissa Khan =

President of the Royal Aeronautical Society

Kerissa Khan MRAeS is a Trinidadian aeronautical engineer and was president of the Royal Aeronautical Society for 2023–24.

== Early life and education ==
Khan grew up in Rio Claro and Mayaro, Trinidad and went to school at ASJA Primary School in Princes Town and Naparima Girls' High School. She was inspired by the Concorde to pursue a career in aerospace and obtained her pilot's licence based at Piarco, Trinidad's international airport. She subsequently moved to Scotland where she gained a Master of Engineering with Honours in Aeronautical Engineering from the University of Glasgow in 2012.

== Career ==
After leaving university, Khan joined French aerospace group Safran, eventually leading the company's UK corporate affairs. Previous roles include research and development of aerospace systems for various aircraft types – the Bombardier Global 7500 being the first. She also worked on the Airbus A320, A321, A330, A350, Boeing 787, Tornado and Eurofighter jets. While at Safran, she was a signatory to the 2019 Women in Defence Charter, committing to work towards a more gender balanced defence industry.

She is currently employed by UK Research and Innovation as Innovation Lead focusing on UKRI's "future flight challenge".

In 2016, Khan was elected as the youngest ever member of the Royal Aeronautical Society's council. She was then elected president for 2023–24, becoming the second woman (after Jenny Body in 2013–14) to hold the position.

== Personal life ==
Khan lives in London and is a Roman Catholic.

Professional and academic associations
Preceded by Peter Round	President of the Royal Aeronautical Society; 2023–2024	Succeeded by David Chinn
