= Boris Laschka =

German fluid dynamics scientist and aeronautical engineer

Boris Laschka (born 6 August 1934) is a German fluid dynamics scientist and aeronautical engineer known for his work in unsteady aerodynamics, in applied aerodynamics, in aeroelasticity, and by his participation in the development of several experimental, civil, and military airplanes, e.g. VTOL VJ 101, Airbus A300 and A310, CN 235 and N 250 (Indonesia) and Tornado aircraft.

== Biography ==
Laschka completed his doctoral thesis on unsteady aerodynamics in Technical University of Munich in 1962. Afterwards he worked for several German aircraft companies in leading positions such as Ernst Heinkel Flugzeugbau, Vereinigte Flugtechnische Werke, Deutsche Airbus and Messerschmitt-Bölkow-Blohm on developments of aircraft, beside others on VTOL VJ 101, Airbus, Tornado . In 1978 he joined the Technical University of Braunschweig as the Chair of the Institute for Fluidmechanics, and in 1986 in the same position the Technical University of Munich. He retired as professor emeritus in 2002. During his research and teaching activities he received several fundings from Aerospace Industry, from European Community, from German Ministries, and from Deutsche Forschungsgemeinschaft . He was president DGLR (German Aerospace Society) during 1976 and 1977 and president International Council of the Aeronautical Sciences (ICAS) during 1986 and 1990. He served as member of the Senat of the "Deutsches Zentrum fuer Luft- und Raumfahrt DLR" (German Research Establishment) and chaired its supervisory board for science and technology, 1978–1988. He contributed in several aeronautical advisory committees as member and chairman to the German Ministry of Research and Technology, 1976–1988. Between 1974 and 1986 he represented the German Ministry of Defense in the NATO AGARD Structures and Material Panel and Fluid Dynamics Panel respectively. He was appointed "Adviser to the Minister of Research and Technology of the Republic of Indonesia", whereby he contributed to strategic planning of Indonesia's aeronautical industry, research and education, 1979–1999. He was chairman of the editors of the "Zeitschrift für Flugwissenschaften und Weltraumforschung" 1978–1988, member of the scientific editorial board of the journal "Recherche Aeronautique and Astronautique" and is member of the international scientific board of the journal "Aerospace Science and Technology".

== Honors ==
Laschka was awarded 1999 the Honorary Fellowship of American Institute of Aeronautics and Astronautics. The International Council of the Aeronautical Sciences (ICAS) honored him with its Life Membership, Honorary Fellowship, and the Maurice-Roy-Medal in 2004 and 2007. DGLR bestowed the Ludwig-Prandtl-Ring upon him, 2002. From the Italian aerospace society AIDAA he got the first "Frecce d'Argento", 1990. The Northwestern Polytechnical University (NPU), Xi'an, PR China appointed him Honorary Professor in 1989. In 1989 he received the Bundesverdienstkreuz (Cross of Merit) by the Federal Republic of Germany and in 1994 the Bintang Jasa Nararya (Star of Merit Nararya) by the Republic of Indonesia. He is Member of the "International Academy for Astronautics" since 1987 and Membre Etrangere and Titulaire, respectively, of the Academie de l'air et de l'espace since 1989.

== Publications ==
- Aerodynamics- Publications, Appreciations, Speeches 1959-2005. Compendium of Publications, edited at Technical University of Munich (2005), Inst. for Aero- and Astronautics
- Zur Theorie der harmonisch schwingenden tragenden Fläche bei Unterschallanströmung, Dissertation Technical University of Munich (1962), published in Zeitschrift f. Flugwiss. 11(1963)
- Interfering Lifting Surfaces In Subsonic Flow, Zeitschrift f. Flugwiss. 18,(1970), see also Journ. of Aircr. Vol.7
- Unsteady Flows - Fundamentals and Applications. AGARD Conference Proceedings (1985)
- Small Disturbance Euler Equations: Efficient and Accurate Tool for Unsteady Load Prediction. Journ. of Aircr. Vol.37
- Fin Buffet Pressure Evaluation Based on Measured Flow Field Velocities. Journ. of Aircr. Vol.35
- Turbulent Wake Vortex Flow of Large Transport Aircraft. ICAS Conference Proceedings (2002)
- Ice Accretion and its Effects on Unprotected Aircraft Components. AGARD Advisory Rep. No. 127 (1977)
- Euler and Navier-Stokes Simulations of Two-Stage Hypersonic Vehicle Motions. Journ. of Spacecraft and Rockets Vol.37
- New Results in Numerical and Experimental Fluid Mechanics IV, ISBN 3-540-20258-7, (2002)
- Festschrift zur Emeritierung von Prof. Dr.-Ing. Boris Laschka, ISBN 3-8316-0180-1, (2002)

== Editor/Co-editor ==
- Proceedings of the International 13th/14th/16th/17th Congress of the International Council of the Aeronautical Sciences (1982)/(1984) ISBN 0-915928-89-2/(1988) ISBN 0-930403-42-8/(1990) ISBN 0-930403-78-9
- Unsteady Aerodynamics.- AGARD Rep. R-645, (1975) ISBN 92-835-0161-6

Preceded by Hermann Schlichting	Chair of Institute for Fluidmechanics, Technische Universitaet Braunschweig; 1978—1986	Succeeded by Herbert Oertel Jr.
Preceded by Erich Truckenbrodt	Chair of Institute for Fluidmechanics, Technical University of Munich; 1986—2002	Succeeded by Nikolaus A. Adams
