= Michael Gaster =

British aerospace engineer

Michael Gaster FRS is a British aerospace engineer, and Professor of Experimental Aerodynamics, at City University, London.

Gaster was awarded the Ludwig-Prandtl-Ring from the Deutsche Gesellschaft für Luft- und Raumfahrt (German Society for Aeronautics and Astronautics) for "outstanding contribution in the field of aerospace engineering" in 2010.
