= Handley Page HP.115 =

1961 experimental aircraft by Handley Page

HP.115
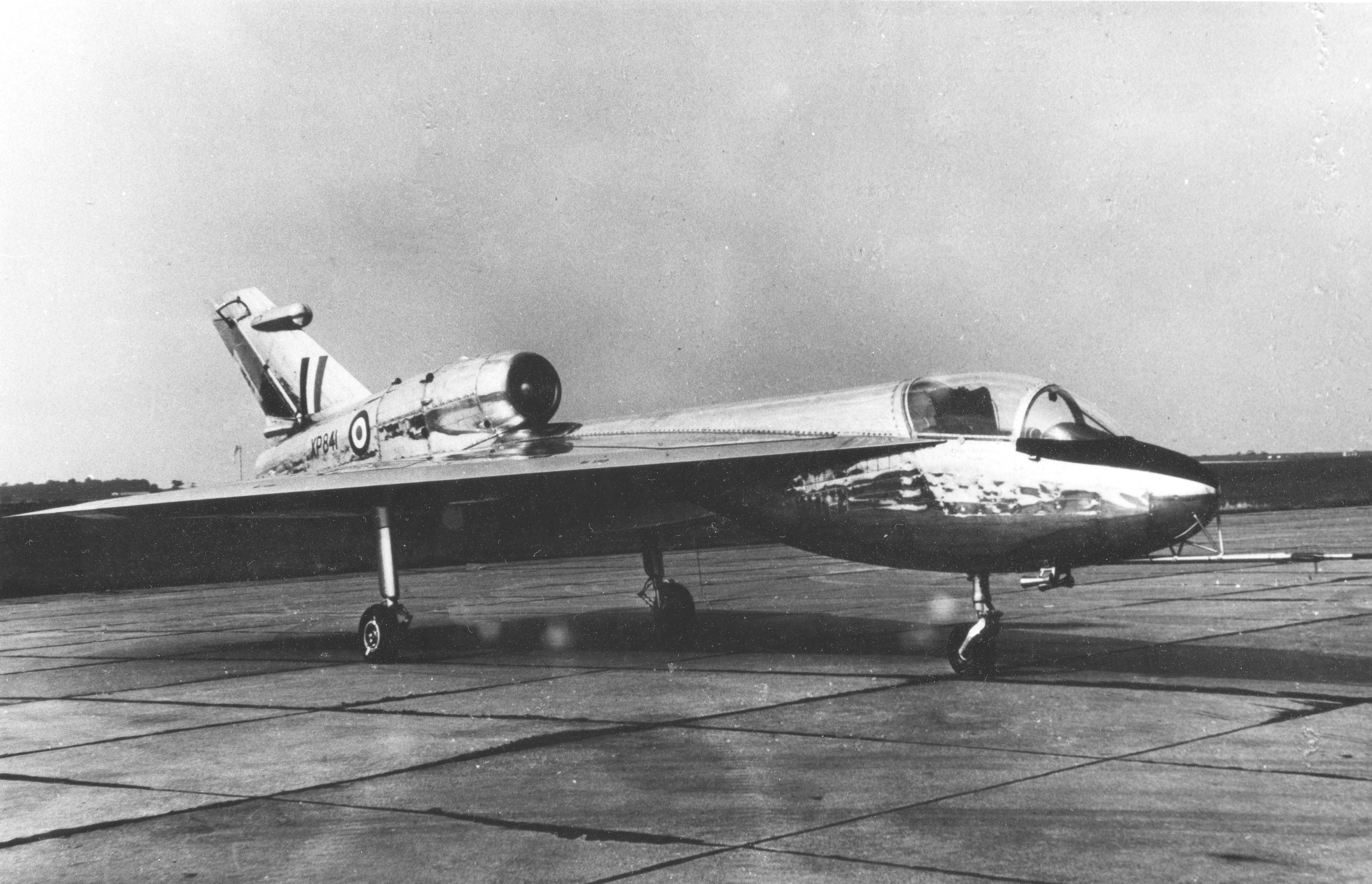
- HP.115 during trials

General information
- Type: Experimental aircraft
- Manufacturer: Handley Page
- Primary user: Royal Aircraft Establishment
- Number built: 1

History
- First flight: 17 August 1961
- Retired: 1974

The Handley Page HP.115 was an experimental delta wing aircraft designed and produced by the British aircraft manufacturer Handley Page. It was built to test the low-speed handling characteristics to be expected from the slender delta configuration anticipated for a future supersonic airliner.

The HP.115 was designed during the 1950s as part of the wider supersonic aircraft research programme that was sponsored by the Ministry of Supply. At the time, both the delta wing and supersonic flight were both relatively recent innovations. By 1956, the Supersonic Transport Committee had deemed it necessary to build a demonstrator to prove that the slender delta wing design was not only suitable for high speed flight but would also be functional at lower speeds. Initially, work centred around an unpowered glider, but it was determined that a self-powered aircraft would be less expensive. Accordingly, Handley Page was selected to produce its proposal, the jet-powered HP.115, at the company's Cricklewood facility.

On 17 August 1961, the sole HP.115 performed its maiden flight; flight testing of the wing commenced shortly thereafter. A separate research aircraft, the BAC 221, was also built to study the high-speed aspects of wing research. Over a relatively lengthy period of experimental flying, the HP.115 proved itself to be relatively capable and provided significant data regarding delta wing characteristics during the takeoff and landing phases. The aircraft itself was withdrawn from the test programme in 1974 and subsequently preserved; it is presently on static display at the Fleet Air Arm Museum. The HP.115 had helped validate the properties of the slender delta wing, leading to a similar wing being adopted for Concorde, the Anglo-French supersonic airliner that entered service in 1976.

== Design and development ==
=== Background ===
Through the 1950s, various studies on supersonic transports (SSTs) suggested that the economics of such designs were far too poor to be practical. Lift is generated in different ways at supersonic speeds and achieving reasonable lift-to-drag ratios requires the wings to have a very short span. This works well at supersonic speeds, but offers very little lift at low speed. In order to design a wing able to take off and land on existing runways, either the aircraft would have to use wider wings and lose supersonic cruise economy, have enormous engine power, or be extremely large. A way out of this dilemma was presented in Britain by Johanna Weber and Dietrich Küchemann around 1955. Their team at the Royal Aircraft Establishment (RAE) noticed that delta wings generated large vortexes over the wing when flying at low speeds and high angles of attack ("alpha").

Specifically, the vortexes increased the speed of the air on top of the wing, thereby greatly increasing lift at low speeds. This effect was magnified by the length of the wing, and the sharpness of the angle of the leading edge - more sweep led to stronger vortex creation, more length gave it more room to operate over. This suggested that an aircraft with a delta wing running the majority of the length of the fuselage at a large sweep angles, over 65 degrees, would have reasonable low-speed performance while also keeping supersonic drag to a minimum through its limited span. A major concern was the angles needed to generate these vortexes. The aircraft would have to fly at what would be considered significantly nose-high attitudes, especially on takeoff and landing. They would also need very long landing gear, especially in the nose, in order to keep the wing at a high angle during the takeoff roll. This led to some questions about the handling and control of such a design at low speed. According to aviation author C. H. Barnes, one source of scepticism for the configuration came from a series of wind tunnel tests that had been performed in America, but were later determined to have been misleading.

=== Glider ===
At the first meeting of the Supersonic Transport Committee in 1956, the need for a dedicated low-speed testbed aircraft was decided to be paramount. As the envisioned test aircraft was only required to fly at very low speeds, it had been originally decided that an unpowered glider would be sufficient. This determination had led to an official specification being formulated after an outline for such an aircraft had been submitted by Slingsby Sailplanes. Development of this glider was awarded to Slingsby, who commenced work on the Slingsby T.48 thereafter.

However, after the operating costs involved in the test programme were reviewed, it was forecast that a powered version would achieve 200% more flying time at 95% less cost per hour. Each flight with the glider required it to be towed by an aircraft, like the English Electric Canberra bomber, to a relatively high altitude of around 30,000 feet (9,100 m). Furthermore, Barnes alleges that some officials, including Godfrey Lee and Charles Joy, favoured metal construction for greater strength; other figures desired the ability to explore the Dutch roll phenomenon and take-offs (both requiring a powered aircraft). For a variety of factors, development of the T.48 was terminated and a revised specification for a self-propelled aircraft was issued in December 1959.

=== Powered ===
The British aircraft manufacturer Handley Page, who had submitted their HP.115 proposal, was authorised to proceed with construction of a single aircraft This work was largely undertaken at the firm's existing facility in Cricklewood. The HP.115 featured a delta wing of very low aspect ratio, which was swept at 75° and featured trailing edge elevons, spring servo-tabs, and anti-balance tabs to provide optimal lateral and longitudinal sensitivity. Infinitely variable perforated air brakes arranged as split flaps were present at 50% chord, and were actuated pneumatically using a pre-charged air bottle. The airfoil section was a modified bi-convex type with the maximum thickness at 4% of the chord. This section was chosen as being representative of the type likely to be adopted for a supersonic transport. It had a favourable chordwise distribution of cross-sectional area and hence low wave drag in supersonic flight. A unique plywood leading edge was employed wherein new sections of different degrees of camber could be substituted, although in practice this feature was never used.

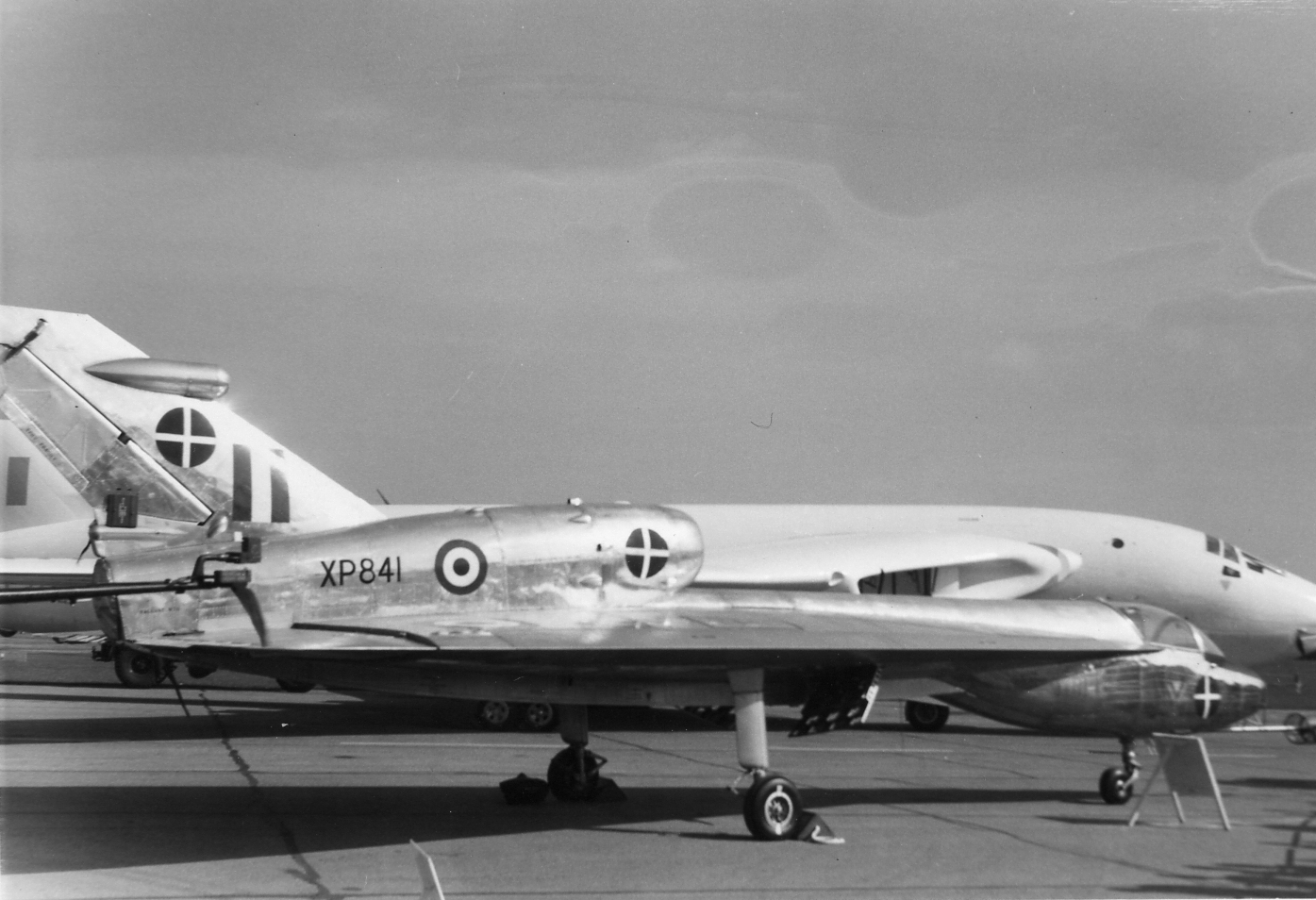
The HP.115 at the Society of British Aerospace Companies (SBAC) airshow in 1961

The cockpit accommodated its pilot, who was seated upon a Martin-Baker-built ejector seat, underneath a sliding canopy. Cockpit instrumentation included an airspeed indicator, altimeter, yawmeter, electric turn-and-slip indicator, artificial horizon, directional gyro, and a stand-by compass. No lighting was provided, enabling a relatively small battery for the turn-and-slip indicator to suffice. Manually operated flight controls were present, which incorporated a differential gearbox arrangement. Hydraulically-actuated wheel brakes, operated by foot pedals in the cockpit, were also provided. When required, additional deceleration was available via a drogue parachute stowed at the base of the rudder. Information such as airspeed, altitude, angles of incident, and other criteria were captured primarily by a pair of synchronised flight recorder.

The aircraft was provided with a fixed tricycle undercarriage, which was derived from the main gear of a BAC Jet Provost Mk 1 and the nosegear from a Jet Provost Mk 2. The fuselage, which was largely constructed of conventional aluminium alloys, comprised a shallow rectangular section girder, with a nacelle at the nose to house the cockpit. It was powered by a single Bristol Siddeley Viper turbojet; up to 150 gallons of fuel could be accommodated within the wing's interior across three separate tanks. The engine was positioned above the wing and set into the base of the tailfin. This fin had a bullet fairing at the top to accommodate a cine-camera to record airflow visualisation experiments, some of which employed smoke generators mounted on the wing leading edges. Both the tailfin and rudder were swept at an angle of 60°, save for a slight up-turning near to the engine exhaust to minimise thrust-related pitching movements.

== Testing and evaluation ==
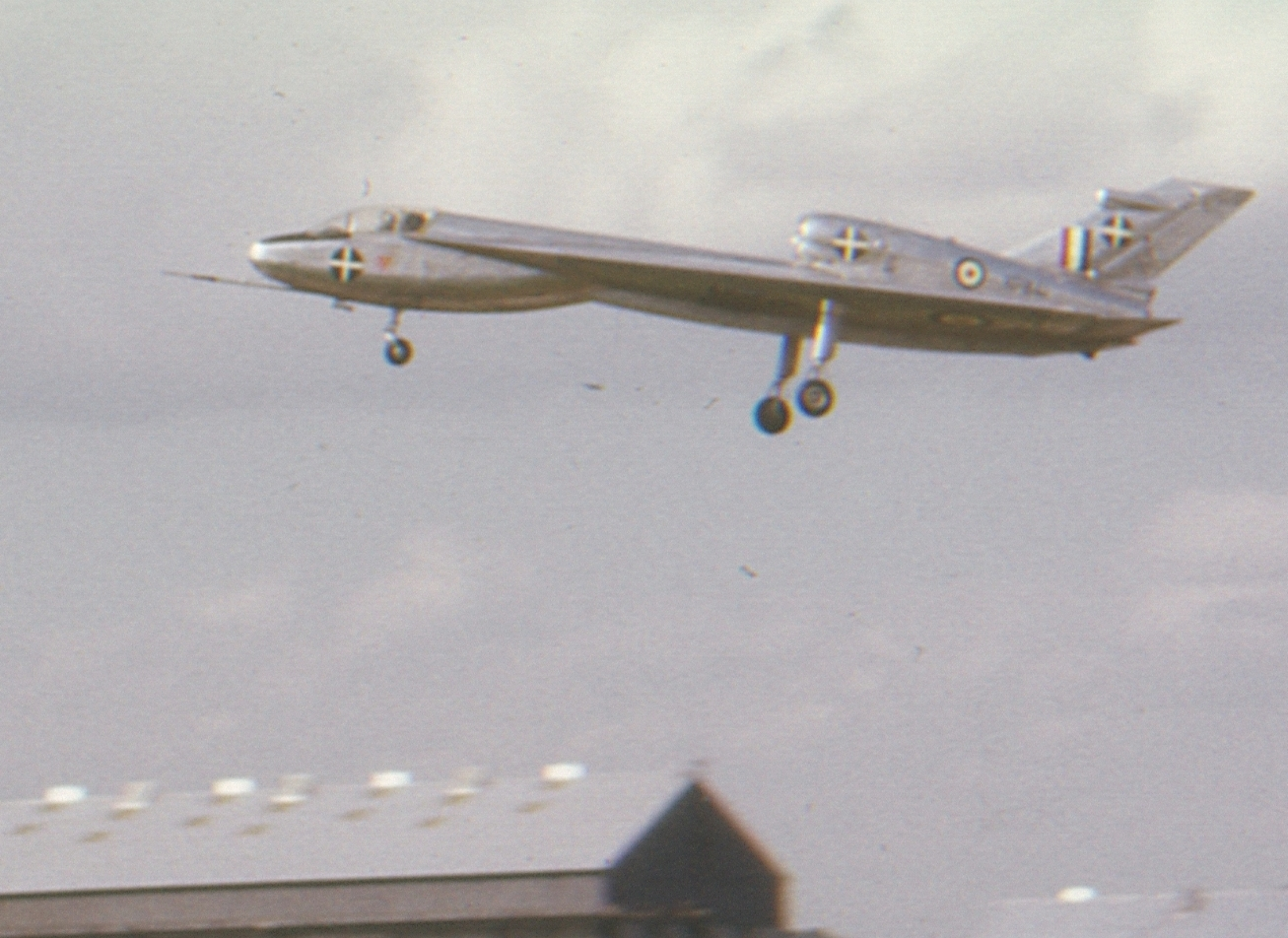
The HP.115 at the Farnborough Air Show in 1962

On 17 August 1961, the single aircraft HP.115, XP841, conducted its maiden flight at the Royal Aircraft Establishment Bedford, piloted by J.M. Henderson, who reported his enthusiasm for this initial flight. This flight had been preceded by extensive ground taxying trials, during which the optimum takeoff trim was determined. In advance of the flight, Henderson had undergone extensive simulator training which, according to Barnes, had projected more pessimistic handling characteristics than in real world flight. All pilots selected to pilot the HP.115 underwent many hours of simulated flight prior to operating the actual aircraft.

Only one month following its maiden flight, the HP.115 performed an aerial display at the 1961 Society of British Aerospace Companies (SBAC) airshow; on 29 September of that year, the contractor's trials were completed. The aircraft was quickly put to use for its intended low-speed research work, supporting the supersonic transport development programme that would ultimately lead to Concorde. In parallel to the HP.115, a separate aircraft, the BAC 221, (a modified Fairey Delta 2) was used to perform high-speed flight research. The HP.115 proved to be very capable aircraft; pilots were able to demonstrate rapid changes of bank while still safely retaining control at speeds as low as 69 mph (60 kn, 111 km/h), about a third of the contemporary Lockheed F-104 Starfighter.

Neil Armstrong was at one point scheduled to fly the HP.115 as a test pilot in 1962, but after his selection as an astronaut, NASA refused him permission to fly the aircraft. He eventually flew it on 22 June 1970.

Despite its involvement in a pair of separate but minor mishaps, the experimental programme was a relatively lengthy one, continuing up to its final flight on 1 February 1974. It provided substantial data on the characteristics of the delta wing, particularly during the crucial phases of takeoff and landing. This work was supported by several radio-controlled scale models of the HP.115. Following the installation of Hartmann noise generators, the aircraft had also been used to study the acoustic properties presented by the configuration. By the time of its retirement, the HP.115 had reportedly accumulated roughly 500 flight hours, which was the aircraft's original design limit.

== Aircraft on display ==
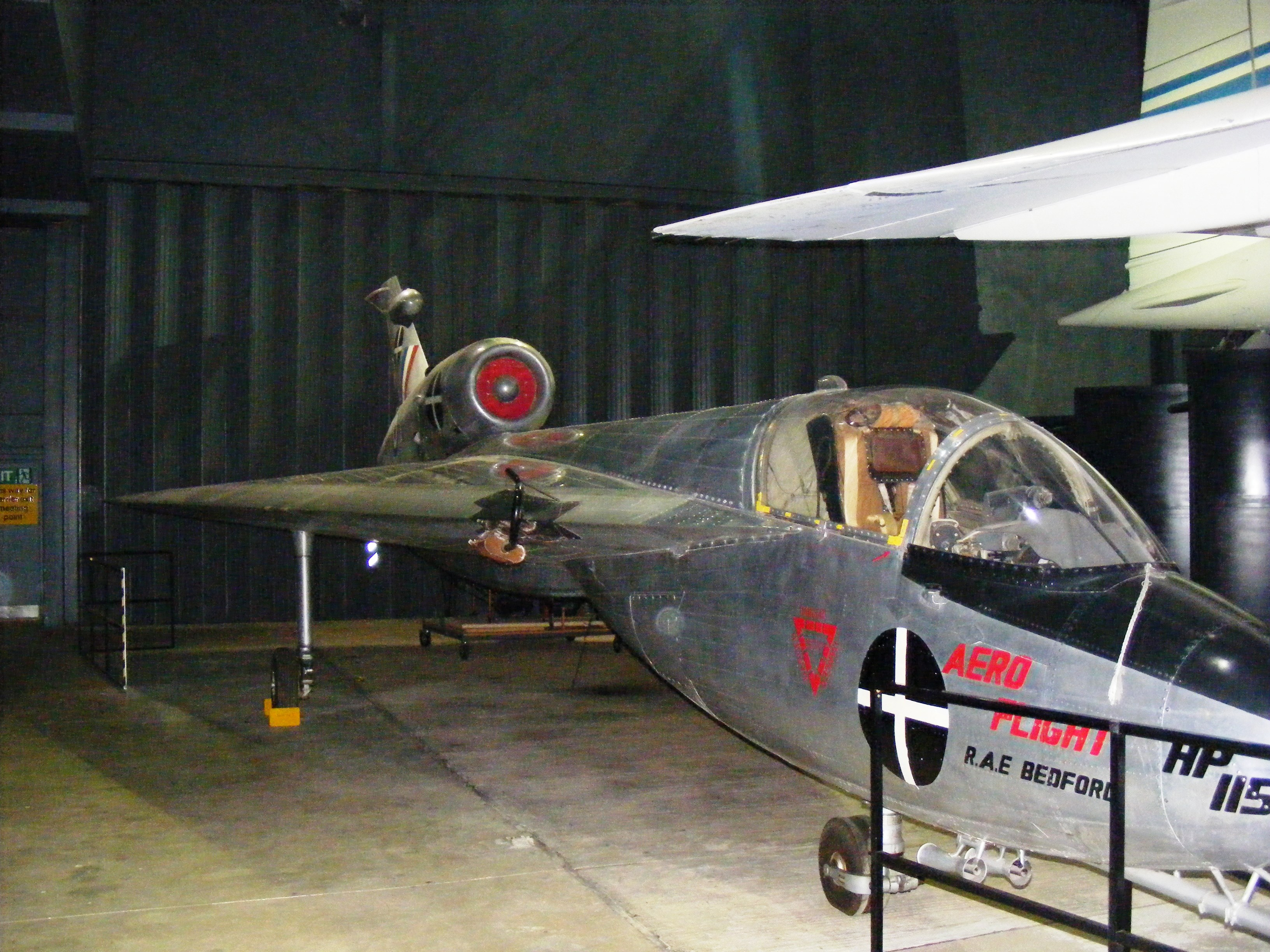
HP.115 at the Fleet Air Arm Museum

Following its retirement at RAE Bedford, XP841 was placed on display at the museum at RAF Colerne. Following closure of the Colerne museum, the aircraft was relocated to the Royal Air Force Museum Cosford and placed on display. With the opening of the Concorde exhibition at the Fleet Air Arm Museum, XP841 was moved south to RNAS Yeovilton. XP841 is on display as part of "The Leading Edge Exhibition," alongside the BAC 221 and a Concorde prototype.

== Operators ==
United Kingdom

- Royal Aircraft Establishment

== Specifications (HP.115) ==
Data from X-Planes and Prototypes: From Nazi Secret Weapons to the Warplanes of the Future

General characteristics

- Crew: 1
- Length: 50 ft 4 in (15.34 m)
- Wingspan: 20 ft 6 in (6.25 m)
- Height: 12 ft 9 in (3.89 m)
- Wing area: 432 sq ft (40.1 m^{2})
- Airfoil: Bicon 6%
- Empty weight: 3,680 lb (1,669 kg)
- Gross weight: 5,050 lb (2,291 kg)
- Powerplant: 1 × Bristol Siddeley Viper BSV.9 turbojet, 1,900 lbf (8.5 kN) thrust

Performance

- Maximum speed: 248 mph (399 km/h, 216 kn)
- Endurance: 40 min

== See also ==
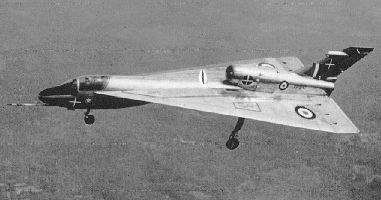
In flight

Aircraft of comparable role, configuration, and era

- Boulton Paul P.111
