= Ludwig Prandtl Ring =

German aerospace engineering award

The Ludwig Prandtl Ring is the highest award of the Deutsche Gesellschaft für Luft- und Raumfahrt (German Society for Aeronautics and Astronautics), awarded "for outstanding contribution in the field of aerospace engineering". The award is named in honour of Ludwig Prandtl.

== Recipients ==
- 1957 Theodore von Kármán
- 1958 Albert Betz
- 1959 Claudius Dornier
- 1960 Frederick Handley Page
- 1961 Henrich Focke
- 1962 Hermann Blenk
- 1963 Maurice Roy (engineer)
- 1964 Ernst Schmidt (engineer)
- 1965 Jakob Ackeret
- 1966 Adolf Busemann
- 1967 Giuseppe Gabrielli
- 1968 Hans W. Liepmann
- 1969 Hermann Schlichting
- 1970 Dietrich Küchemann
- 1971 Robert Legendre
- 1972 Ludwig Bölkow
- 1973 Klaus Oswatitsch
- 1974 William R. Sears
- 1975 August W. Quick
- 1976 Alec David Young
- 1977 Erich Truckenbrodt
- 1978 Robert Thomas Jones
- 1979 Fritz Schultz-Grunow
- 1980 Herbert A. Wagner
- 1981 Hans G. Küssner
- 1982 Kurt Magnus
- 1983 James Lighthill
- 1984 Bernhard H. Goethert
- 1985 Luigi Crocco
- 1986 Roger Béteille
- 1987 Holt Ashley
- 1988 Itiro Tani
- 1989 Karl Wieghardt
- 1990 Hubert Ludwieg
- 1991 Gero Madelung
- 1992 Hans von Ohain
- 1993 Xaver Hafer
- 1994 Josef Singer
- 1995 Werner Albring
- 1996 Harvard Lomax
- 1997 Philippe Poisson-Quinton
- 1998 Jürgen Zierep
- 1999 Hans G. Hornung
- 2000 Julius C. Rotta
- 2001 Not awarded
- 2002 Boris Laschka
- 2003 Klaus Gersten
- 2004 Egon Krause
- 2005 Wilhelm Schneider
- 2006 Richard Eppler
- 2007 Peter Hamel
- 2008 Yuri Kachanov
- 2009 Siegfried Wagner
- 2010 Michael Gaster
- 2011 Not awarded
- 2012 John W. Hutchinson
- 2013 Gottfried Sachs
- 2014 Dietrich Hummel
- 2015 Dietmar Hennecke
- 2016 Egbert Torenbeek
- 2017 Helmut Sobieczky
- 2018 Hermann Fasel
- 2019 Ann Dowling
- 2022 Henk Tijdeman
- 2023 Ulrich Schumann
- 2025 Robert Luckner

== See also ==
- List of aviation awards
- List of engineering awards
