= Johanna Weber =

German mathematician

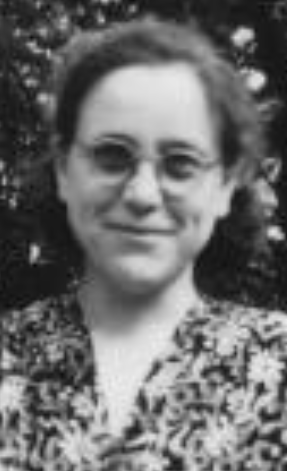
Johanna Weber in 1948, soon after her arrival in England.

Johanna Weber (8 August 1910 – 24 October 2014) was a German-born British mathematician and aerodynamicist. She is best known for her contributions to the development of the Handley Page Victor bomber and the Concorde.

== Early life ==
Johanna Weber was born in a family of Walloon origin in Düsseldorf, Germany, on August 8, 1910. Her father died in the First World War. As a 'war orphan', Weber was eligible for financial support, and she attended a convent school.

In 1929, she began studies in chemistry and mathematics at the University of Cologne, but switched a year later to the University of Göttingen. She graduated with a first class honours degree in 1935, and then trained as a teacher for two years. As she did not join the Nazi Party, she was prohibited from taking a post as a teacher. Her remaining family, comprising her mother and sister, were in need of financial support, so she sought employment in the armaments industry.

== Career ==
Weber joined Krupp in Essen as a researcher in ballistics. Her work involved tedious mathematical computations using the Brunsviga mechanical calculators.

=== Aerodynamics Research Institute ===
In 1939, Weber joined the Aerodynamics Research Institute (Aerodynamische Versuchsanstalt Göttingen) in Göttingen. She was part of a small theoretical team, and her initial training in aerodynamics consisted of wind tunnel corrections. Here she met and began her lifelong collaboration with Dietrich Küchemann.

Scientists at Institute had by then worked out a consistent theory of flow around an aircraft. This was, however, an approximation, using singularities to represent the vortices that generated lift, and Weber was given the task of improving it. She realised that some of her work overlapped with Küchemann's research on jet engine intakes. They teamed up, with Weber doing the theoretical development and wind tunnel testing, and Küchemann setting the direction of their research based on his consultation with manufacturers. Over the period of the Second World War, they created a substantial body of work.

=== Royal Aircraft Establishment ===
Following the capture of Göttingen by the US Army in 1945, the city fell into the British occupation zone. The British paid Weber and Küchemann to compile a monograph of their researches. These would form the basis of their text Aerodynamics of Propulsion. They also encouraged German scientists to take up six month contracts at various defence facilities in the UK as part of the combined US-UK plan (Operation Paperclip and Operation Surgeon) to acquire German services and technologies. In October 1946, Küchemann joined the Aerodynamics department at the Royal Aircraft Establishment in Farnbourough, and persuaded Weber to join him. Both of them continued to renew their six-month contracts, although both remained classed as enemy aliens, until 1953 when both were naturalised as British citizens.

Weber, as the only woman among the German scientists, was accommodated at an RAE staff hostel. She joined the Low Speed Wind Tunnels division at the RAE, which was headed by Frances Bradfield. She began experimental work on air intakes under John Seddon.

In 1946, the British Air Ministry specified a medium-range jet propelled bomber capable of carrying a nuclear weapon. The Handley Page Victor bomber was the most ambitious of the designs proposed in response. Küchemann had kept abreast of German work into swept-wing aircraft, in particular the crescent-shaped wing, and the aerodynamics of supersonic flight. The Victor would have three segmented wings of crescent shape, each with a different sweep angle. Weber assisted with the calculations, and incorporated further design improvements including the engine air inputs based on the work she had done with Küchemann during the war. Her linear and simple aerodynamic models were calculated by hand by a team of women 'computors'. In September 1945, she co-wrote with Küchemann a paper analysing the aerodynamics of the new wing and fuselage.

Weber's subsequent work with Küchemann was in improving the theory of subsonic aerodynamics. Initial methods treated wing thickness and lift in isolation. In the 1950s, she developed a simultaneous treatment of all the features of a wing (thickness, twist, sweepback, camber) to predict the air pressure distribution over it. The Vickers aircraft team then solved the inverse problem - that of determining the wing shape that best suited a required pressure distribution. The resultant wing shape, the most advanced for a civilian craft, was used on the Vickers VC10 airliner.

==== Concorde ====
Weber also began her research into supersonic transport. In 1955, she showed that a thin delta wing with a high angle of attack could generate sufficient lift to provide the take-off and landing capability, while simultaneously enabling efficient supersonic performance. Küchemann then advocated this wing configuration with the UK Government, resulting in the support for a Mach 2 airliner by the Supersonic Transport Advisory Committee (STAC) in 1956.

In 1961, a prototype aircraft, the Handley Page HP.115, was built to test the low speed performance of the slender delta wing.

Weber made two fundamental contributions to the supersonic effort: tools to predict the drag on a slender delta-winged aircraft during supersonic flight, and shaping the wing to allow the formation of vortices at its leading edge, rather than above or below it. Her work from 1959 onwards contributed to the design and the eventual construction of the Concorde.

==== Airbus ====
Weber reverted to subsonic researches following the Concorde. In particular, she analysed the conditions under which methods addressing airflows slower than the speed of sound continued to be applicable at supercritical levels. Her refinement of existing theories, which were based on incompressible flows, helped automate the computations to render exact, rather than approximate, solutions. One of the chief sources of aerodynamic inefficiency was the junction of the wing and the fuselage, and she was able to model its entire three-dimensional profile. These methods, along with others evolving from the development of the VC10, were used in the design of the Airbus A300B aircraft, the first wide-body twinjet in the world.

== Later life and death ==
Weber retired in 1975 at the grade of Senior Principal Scientific Officer, and continued to be retained by the RAE as a consultant. She had nearly 100 papers to her name. In 1976, following Küchemann's death, Weber assisted in the publication of his book The Aerodynamic Design of Aircraft, which was published in 1978. She announced that she was done with aerodynamics after that.

Weber remained unmarried all her life. She lived in the RAE hostel until 1953, and then moved into a bedsit attached to Küchemann's house in Wrecclesham, Surrey, where she lived till 1961, when she acquired the house next door to the Küchemanns. She found it difficult to obtain a mortgage, as banks and building societies tended not to lend to single women for home purchases at the time.

After retirement, Weber discovered new interests in psychology and geology, taking classes at the University of Surrey.

Weber's younger sister, to whom she was very close, had been in poor health for most of her life. Weber supported her and their mother financially, sending money to Germany, and wanted to return to them. Her sister died at the age of 50.

Weber lived in her house till 2010. She died in a nursing home in Farnham, Surrey, on 24 October 2014.

== Selected publications ==
- Küchemann, Dietrich; Weber, Johanna (1948). Application of theory of incompressible flow around a swept wing at high subsonic mach numbers. London: Ministry of Supply.
- Küchemann, Dietrich; Weber, Johanna (1949). Design of wing junction, fuselage and nacelles to obtain the full benefit of sweptback wings at high Mach number: Addendum, additional tables of coefficients. London: Ministry of Supply.
- Küchemann, Dietrich; Weber, Johanna (1951). Annular bodies of infinite length with circulation for smooth entrance. Washington, D.C.: National Advisory Committee for Aeronautics.
- Küchemann, Dietrich; Weber, Johanna (November 1951), Concerning the flow about ring-shaped cowlings. Part II, Annular bodies of infinite length with circulation for smooth entrance, Washington, D.C.: National Advisory Committee for Aeronautics, Technical Memorandum 1326, "Translation of ZWB Forschungsbericht Nr. 1236/2 November 11, 1940"
- Weber, Johanna; Brebner, G.G. (June 1952). A simple estimate of the profile drag of swept wings (Report RAE TN Aero 2168).
- Küchemann, Dietrich; Weber, Johanna (1953). Aerodynamics of Propulsion. McGraw-Hill.
- Küchemann, Dietrich; Weber, Johanna; Brebner, G.G. (1958). Low speed tests on 45 deg swept-back wings. London: HMSO.
- Küchemann, Dietrich; Weber, Johanna (1968). "Analysis of some performance aspects of various types of aircraft, designed to fly at different ranges and speeds". Progress in Aeronautical Sciences. 9. doi:10.1016/0376-0421(68)90008-0.
