= Küssner effect =

Concept in aerodynamics

An airfoil flying into a gust region. The airfoil speed is denoted with V and is constant, the lift force on the airfoil is given by L, and its pitching moment by M. The gust has a transverse (vertical) velocity w, which is assumed to be a constant in the gust region, left of the dashed line.

In fluid dynamics, the Küssner effect describes the unsteady aerodynamic forces on an airfoil or hydrofoil caused by encountering a transverse gust. This is directly related to the Küssner function, used in describing the effect. Both the effect and function are named after Hans Georg Küssner (1900–1984), a German aerodynamics engineer.

Küssner derived an approximate model for an airfoil encountering a sudden step-like change in the transverse gust velocity; or, equivalently, as seen from a frame of reference moving with the airfoil: a sudden change in the angle of attack. The airfoil is modelled as a flat plate in a potential flow, moving with constant horizontal velocity. For this case he derived the impulse response function (known as Küssner function) needed to compute the unsteady lift and moment exerted by the air on the airfoil.

== Bibliography ==
- H.G. Küssner (December 20, 1936), "Zusammenfassender Bericht über den instationären Auftrieb von Flügeln (Summary report on the instationary lift of wings)", Luftfahrtforschung (in German), 13 (12): 410–424
- H.G. Küssner (1937), "Flügel- und Leitwerkflattern" (in German)
- H.G. Küssner (1940), "Der schwingende Flügel mit aerodynamisch ausgeglichenem Ruder" (in German)
- H.G. Küssner (1940), "Allgemeine Tragflächentheorie" (in German)
- Ernst H. Hirschel; Horst Prem; Gero Madelung (2004), Aeronautical Research in Germany: From Lilienthal until Today, Springer, p. 287, ISBN 978-3-540-40645-7
- Tuncer Cebeci (2005), Analysis of Low-speed Unsteady Airfoil Flows, Springer, pp. 15–16 & 52, ISBN 0-9668461-8-4
- Raymond L. Bisplinghoff; Holt Ashley; Robert L. Halfman (1996), Aeroelasticity (revised ed.), Dover, pp. 281–286, ISBN 0-486-69189-6
- John M. Eggleston (1956), Calculation of the forces and moments on a slender fuselage and vertical fin penetrating lateral gusts (PDF), NACA Technical Note 3805 Page 3
- Beerinder Singh; Inderjit Chopra (September 2008), "Insect-Based Hover-Capable Flapping Wings for Micro Air Vehicles: Experiments and Analysis", AIAA Journal, 46 (9): 2115–2135, Bibcode:2008AIAAJ..46.2115S, doi:10.2514/1.28192
- L.M. Laudanski (July 2000), "Random disturbances, airplane loads and its fatigue life", Probabilistic Engineering Mechanics, 15 (3): 233–240, Bibcode:2000PEngM..15..233L, doi:10.1016/S0266-8920(98)00020-4
