= Frances Bradfield =

Aeronautical engineer

- Born: 9 October 1895; Leicester
- Died: 26 February 1967 (aged 71); Swanage
- Awards: OBE 1947

Frances Beatrice Bradfield OBE FRAeS (9 October 1895– 26 February 1967) was an aeronautical engineer at the Royal Aircraft Establishment (RAE). She worked at RAE Farnborough, where she headed the Wind Tunnels Section. Here she mentored many of the younger male engineers who joined the RAE.

== Early life and education ==
Frances Bradfield was born in 1895, in Leicester, and in 1914 "came up" to Newnham College, Cambridge, graduating with a second class BA degree in Mathematics in 1917.

== Royal Aeronautical Establishment ==
Sometime after graduating from Cambridge, probably around 1919, Bradfield joined the Royal Aircraft Establishment (RAE) at Farnborough, Hampshire, where she spent her entire career research aeronautics and specialising in Wind tunnel research. Bradfield's earliest published research at the RAE - credited gender-ambiguously to "F.B. Bradfield" - was published in December 1919 on "Wind channel test of Bristol Pullman body." During her first decade and beyond, Bradfield published her wind tunnel research prolifically, publishing two research papers most years.

In the early 1930s (before 1934), Bradfield worked with George Douglas then Head of Wind Tunnels at RAE Farnborough as his mathematician. Her job was to liaise between Hermann Glauert, then Head of Aerodynamics Department, and Douglas. Glauert was killed in an accident in 1934, and so Douglas was appointed Head of Aerodynamics Department and Bradfield became the Head of Wind Tunnels (more informally known as the small wind tunnel section of the model research department), a role she held for the remainder of the 1930s and throughout World War II.

In 1935, Bradfield appeared in the Imperial Calendar and Civil Service list for this year. Not being an engineer, Bradfield insisted on having Charles Callen as her supporting engineer, in order to ensure that what they did in the wind tunnels was sound engineering-wise. In March 1939, Bradfield in collaboration with D.L. Ellis presented a paper before the Royal Aeronautical Society on "The Use of Model Data in Aeroplane Design," published in the Women Engineer. In November 1939, Bradfield was listed as a Senior Scientific Officer at the Royal Aircraft Establishment at RAE Farnborough. In December 1941, Bradfield was one of the two female Associate Fellows of the Royal Aeronautical Society doing "important work" at RAE Farnborough. By 1946, when Johanna Weber joined the Low Speed Wind Tunnels division at RAE Farnborough, Bradfield was head of the Low Speed Wind Tunnels Division of the Aerodynamics Department. Bradfield's female colleagues at RAE Farnborough included Weber and Beatrice Shilling.

== Awards and recognition ==
At some point between 1919 and 1935, Bradfield became a member of the Women's Engineering Society (WES) but was not a particularly active member and was only mentioned occasionally in their journal, The Women Engineer. Bradfield became a Fellow of the Royal Aeronautical Society (FRAeS) in 1944 and won their Bronze Medal in 1949. In 1947, Bradfield was awarded an OBE in recognition of her role as Principal Scientific Officer at RAE Farnborough.

== Later life ==
Bradfield died in Poole in 1967. A former colleague, John Green, described Bradfield, known as 'Miss B.', as "an exacting but kindly boss who had a powerful influence on the generation of young graduates who were posted into Aerodynamics Department at the beginning of the war – an influence that they carried with them through their later careers into senior positions."

Bradfield's biography was published by the Oxford Dictionary of National Biography on 9 May 2019, as part of their support for the Women's Engineering Society's centenary.
