= Council of European Aerospace Societies =

European aerospace professional association

The Council of European Aerospace Societies was formed in 1993 as the Confederation of European Aerospace Societies in recognition of the increasingly international nature of aerospace business. The transition from Confederation to Council took place in 2003 with the intention of providing improved collaboration, legal status and use of the resources of the constituent societies.

CEAS primary objective is to enhance the value of the diverse services offered by the Member Societies at a European level, facilitating greater dialogue between them and European institutions, governments, the aerospace and defence industries, and academia.

CEAS is governed by a Board of Trustees, which includes representatives from each Member Society. Its head office is located in Brussels, Belgium.

== Constituent societies ==
CEAS currently comprises eleven Trustee Member Societies (with a combined roughly 35.000 individual members):

- Association Aéronautique et Astronautique de France (3AF or AAAF); Aeronautics and Astronautics Association of France, France
- Asociatia Aeronautica si Astronautica a Romaniei (AAAR); Aeronautics and Astronautics Association of Romania, Romania
- Asociación de Ingenieros Aeronáuticos de España (AIAE); Association of Aeronautical Engineers of Spain, Spain
- Associazione Italiana di Aeronautica e Astronautica (AIDAA); Italian Association of Aeronautics and Astronautics, Italy
- Odborná společnost letecká České republiky (CzAeS); Czech Aerospace Society, Czech Republic
- Deutsche Gesellschaft für Luft- und Raumfahrt (DGLR); German Society for Aeronautics and Astronautics, Germany
- Flygtekniska Föreningen. Svensk förening för flygteknik och rymdteknik (FTF); Swedish Society of Aeronautics and Astronautics, Sweden
- Nederlandse Vereniging voor Luchtvaarttechniek (NVvL); Netherlands Association of Aeronautical Engineers, Netherlands
- Polskie Stowarzyszenie Aeronautyki i Astronautyki (PSAA); Polish Society of Aeronautics and Astronautics, Poland
- Royal Aeronautical Society (RAeS), United Kingdom
- Schweizerische Vereinigung für Flugwissenschaften (SWfV); Swiss Association of Aeronautical Sciences, Switzerland

and seven Corporate Members:

- European Union Aviation Safety Agency (EASA)
- European Space Agency (ESA)
- EUROAVIA (European Association of Aerospace Students)
- Eurocontrol (European Organisation for the Safety of Air Navigation)
- Von Karman Institute for Fluid Dynamics (VKI)
- National Institute for Aerospace Research "Elie Carafoli" (INCAS)
- SAE International

== Publications ==
- CEAS Aeronautical Journal
- CEAS Space Journal
- The Aerospace Europe Bulletin
- CEAS 25th Anniversary Book

== Conferences ==
CEAS organises or co-sponsors various conferences and in particular the CEAS Aerospace Europe Conference (AEC). The previous CEAS conferences were Berlin (2007), Manchester (2009), Venice (2011), Linkoping (2013), Delft (2015), Bucharest (2017), Bordeaux (2020), Warsaw (2021), Lausanne (2023) and Turin in December 2025 (cf. CEAS AEC 2025 website).

== Honours and awards ==
CEAS recognises outstanding achievements and contributions through various awards:

- CEAS Gold Award
- CEAS Distinguished Service Award
- CEAS Aeronautical/Space Journal Most Cited Award
- Marc Pélegrin Award
