= Jenny Body =

British aerospace engineer

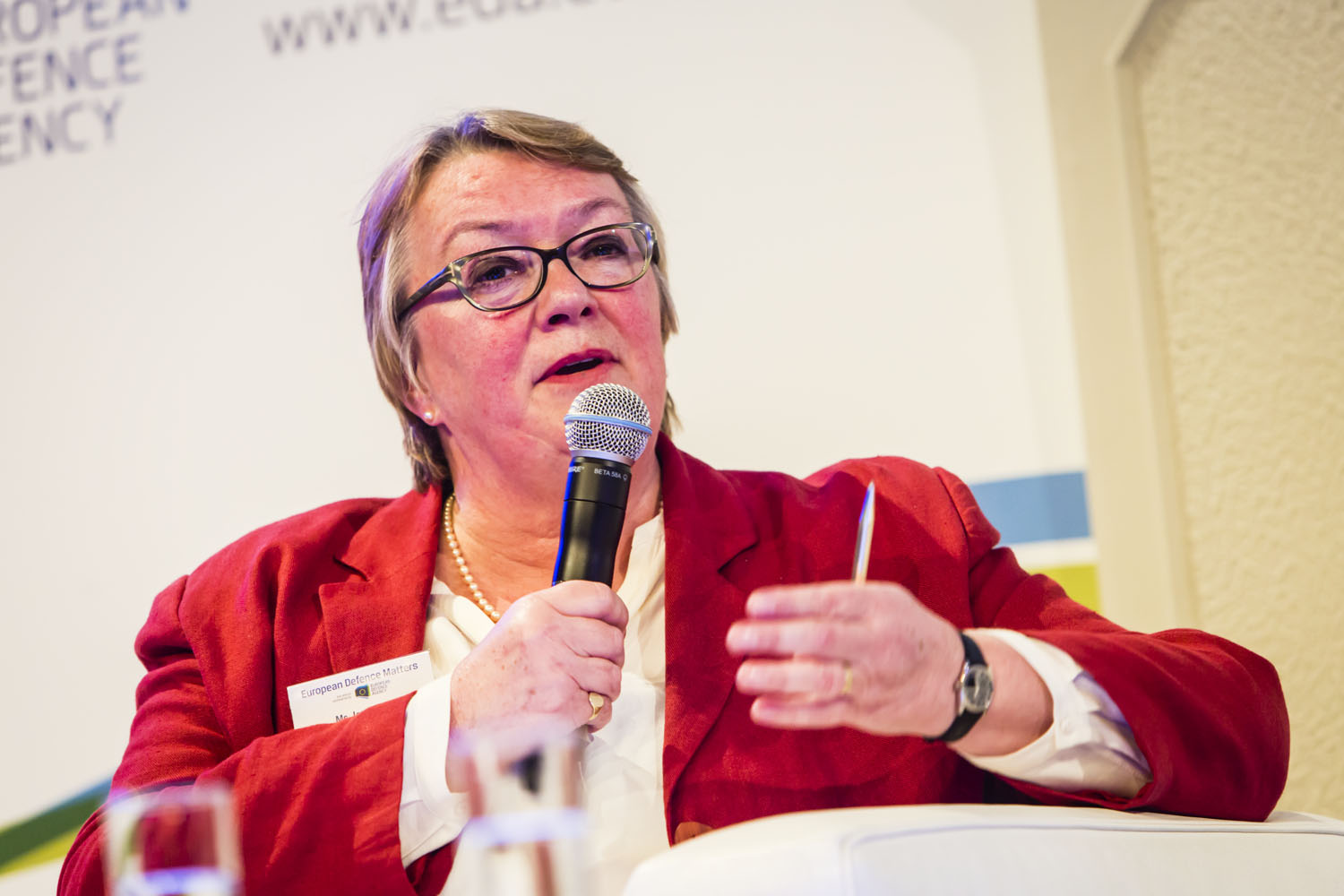
- Education: British Aerospace
- Employer: Airbus
- Known for: First woman to become President of Royal Aeronautical Society

Jennifer Mary Body is a British aerospace engineer, the former President of the Royal Aeronautical Society.

== Early life and education ==
Body, whose father was an aerospace engineer, was the only girl in her physics class at high school in Bristol. in 1971 she became an undergraduate Mechanical Engineering apprentice with British Aerospace. She studied at Imperial College London.

== Career ==
Working in the avionics group at British Aerospace, Body created the software for the fly-by-wire aircraft. She established the Next Generation Composite Wing Programme, the biggest UK Aerospace programme so far. In 2009 she established the Women in Aviation and Aerospace Committee. In 2002 she was made engineering lead of the Nimrod wing design team. She has been a technical manager for wing assembly.

In 2013 Body became the first woman to be President of the Royal Aeronautical Society since its creation in 1866. During her time as President, she focussed on the development of women's technical skills, trying to inspire and motivate young people to consider careers in aerospace engineering. In 2014 she announced a memorandum of understanding had been signed between the International Aviation Women Association and the Royal Aeronautical Society to recruit and up-skill women within the aviation industry. She regularly represents the society to this day, awarding prizes and giving interviews to the press. She spoke about the lack of skills in the aerospace industry on BBC Radio Norfolk. On 16 July 2016, the University of the West of England awarded her an honorary doctorate. She is on the Advisory Board of the Centre for Employment Studies Research.

Body is a Fellow of the Royal Aeronautical Society. In 2013 she became a Fellow of City and Guilds of London Institute. She was awarded an Order of the British Empire in 2010 for services to engineering. In 2010 she retired from Airbus, where she was the most senior female engineer. She was a member of the Royal Society Diversity Committee between 2015 and 2017. She works on the Diversity Strategy of the Royal Academy of Engineering. She is a chair of the Royal Aeronautical Society Education and Skills Committee. She is part of the British Computer Society Women in STEM network. She is an ambassador of Aerospace Bristol.

Already, Officer of the Order of the British Empire (OBE), Body was appointed Commander of the Order of the British Empire (CBE) in the 2020 New Year Honours for services to aerospace engineering.
