= ESDU =

UK engineering advisory organisation

ESDU (originally an acronym of "Engineering Sciences Data Unit" but now used on its own account) is an engineering advisory organisation based in the United Kingdom.

== Profile ==
ESDU provides validated engineering analysis tools to engineers and teachers in the aerospace engineering, process engineering and structural engineering fields. The tools include methodologies, design guides, equations and software, and are accompanied by an advisory service that enables engineers to discuss their requirements and data application directly with ESDU staff.

ESDU's engineering staff are assisted and guided in their work by independent committees of specialists drawn from industry and academia worldwide. They are responsible for ensuring the technical quality of the work and for presenting the data in a clear, concise, authoritative manner. They also determine the future direction of the work, taking into account the views of users.

=== Engineering topics covered ===
The services offered by ESDU cover a wide variety of different engineering fields. These include:

- Aerodynamics
- Aircraft noise
- Composite materials
- Dynamics
- Fatigue
- Fracture Mechanics
- Fluid Mechanics
- Heat Transfer
- Mechanisms
- Aircraft Performance
- Physical Data, Chemical Engineering
- Physical Data, Mechanical Engineering
- Process Engineering Technology
- Sound Propagation
- Stress and Strength of Components
- Structures
- Transonic Aerodynamics
- Tribology
- Vibration and Acoustic Fatigue
- Wind Engineering

== History ==
In 1940 with World War II raging the British aircraft industry was rapidly expanding. Engineers from other industries as diverse as bicycle manufacture and piano making who lacked the specialised knowledge required for aircraft design were being drafted into the war effort to assist with the design and construction of aircraft.

To meet this challenge, the government asked the Royal Aeronautical Society to form a Technical Department with the aim of producing easy-to-use design guides, data sheets and analysis methodologies. More importantly the Technical Department was to validate this work to ensure its accuracy. To ensure the authority and quality of the work, a Technical Committee was established, with its expert members drawn from across the many aircraft companies and research establishments. In short, ESDU were tasked with bridging the gap between research and industry. This unique philosophy of collaboration allowed the team to assemble a large collection of validated design guides and data sheets for use by the aircraft industry.

Towards the end of the 1960s, grant aid was withdrawn and ESDU became a commercial entity selling subscriptions to its services. In 1998 ESDU was purchased by IHS Inc. based in Denver, United States, which, in turn became part of S&P Global. In 2023 S&P Global spun off its Engineering Solutions division, which includes ESDU, as a newly formed company called Accuris.
