= Association Aéronautique et Astronautique de France =

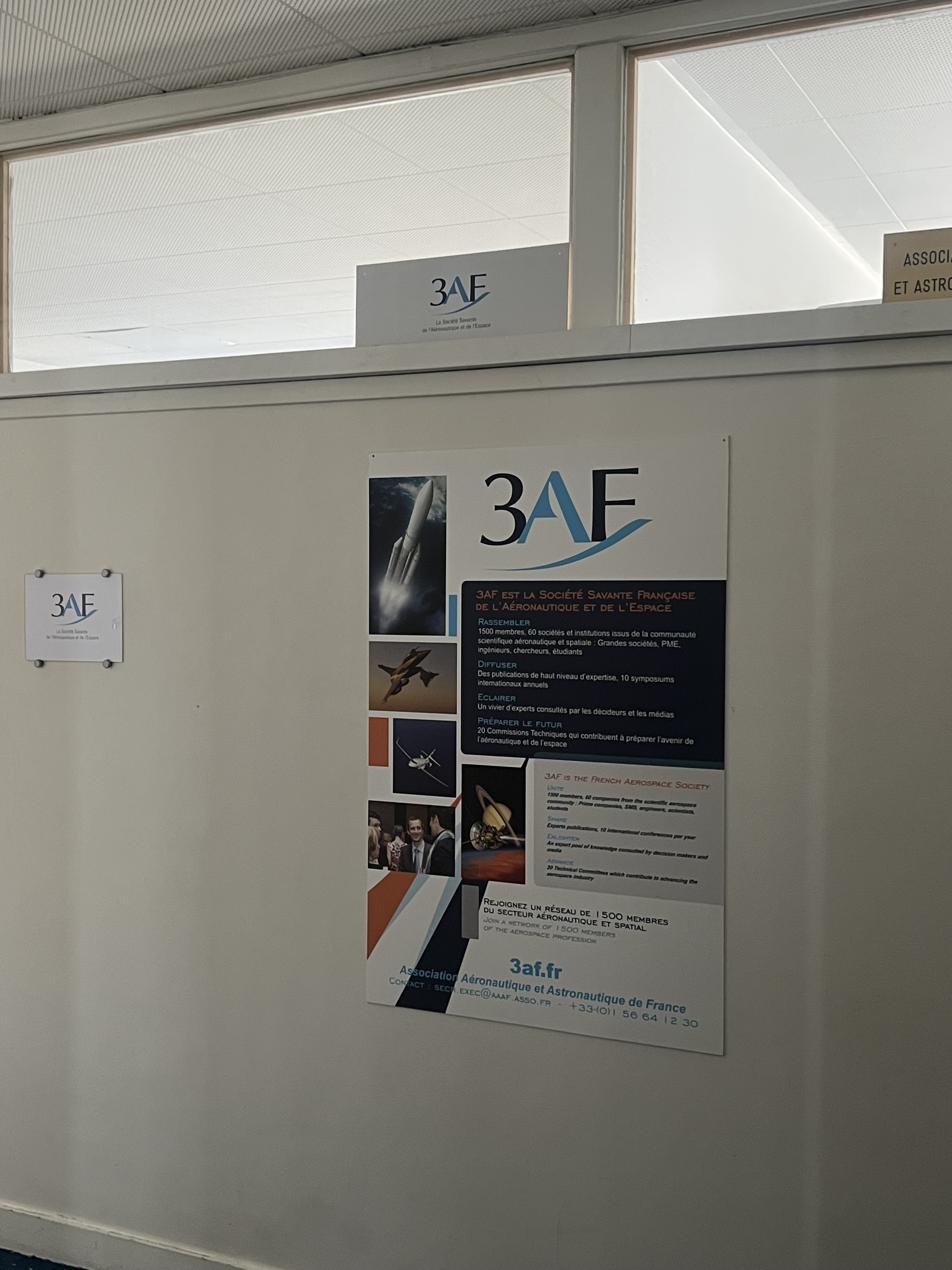
Association Aéronautique et Astronautique de France office headquarters in Paris

Association Aéronautique et Astronautique de France (3AF or AAAF) is the French national aeronautical and astronautical association. It is located in Paris.

It has been created in 1971 from the Association Française des Ingénieurs et Techniciens de l'Aéronautique et de l'Espace (AFITAE) created in 1945 and the Société Française d'Astronautique (SFA) created in 1955.

The 3AF activity is to bring together people interested, for professional or personal reasons, in the aerospace sector to represent their point of view and to help the development of scientific and technological knowledge related to the aerospace industry and its history. Its members are mostly technicians, engineers and researchers. Its industrial partners are the largest industries in national and European industry, such as Alcatel Space, EADS and Arianespace. It also has honorary members.

3AF is a founding member of the Confederation of European Aerospace Societies (CEAS) together with the equivalent German association Deutsche Gesellschaft für Luft - und Raumfahrt Lilienthal - Oberth eV (DGLR), Britain's Royal Aeronautical Society (RAES) and the Italian Italian Association of Aeronautics and Astronantica (AIDA).
