= Aerodynamics Research Institute =

Historic German research institute

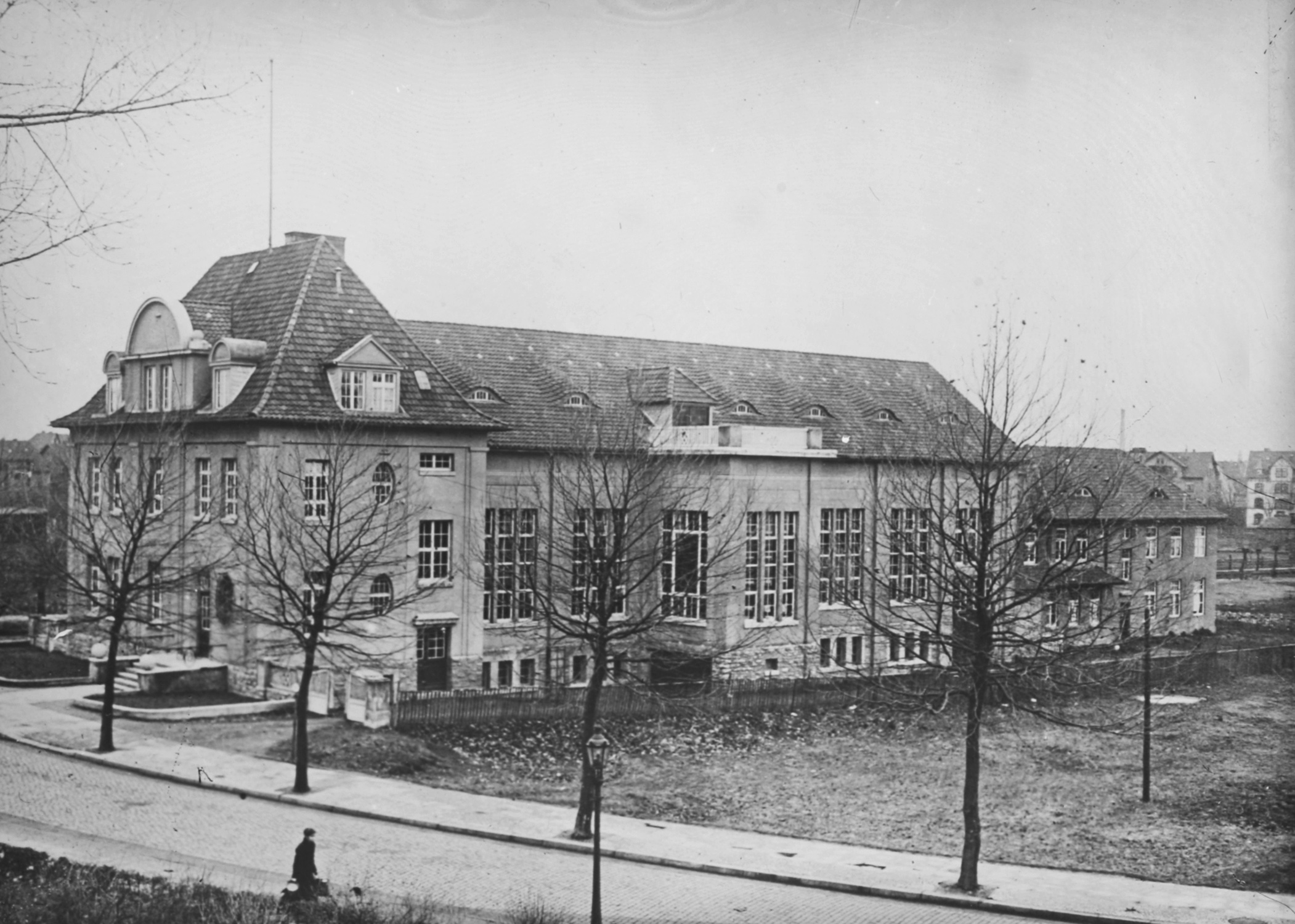
General view of the Model Research Institute for Aerodynamics (MVA) in Göttingen, Böttingerstraße (1919). The MVA was taken over in 1919 as the "Aerodynamic Research Institute of the Kaiser Wilhelm Society" in the Kaiser Wilhelm Society

The Aerodynamische Versuchsanstalt (AVA) in Göttingen was one of the four predecessor organizations of the 1969 founded "German Research and Experimental Institute for Aerospace", which in 1997 was renamed German Aerospace Center (DLR).

== History ==
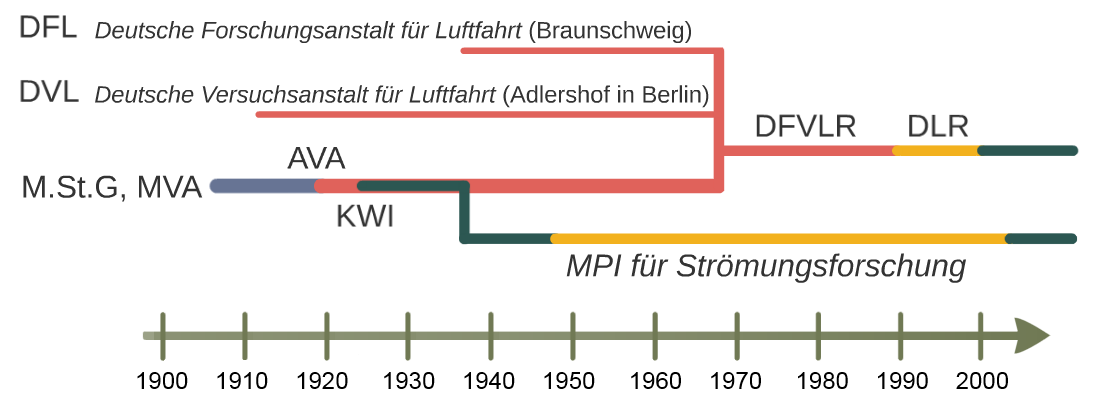
Development of aerodynamic institutes in Göttingen

The AVA was created in 1919 from the 1907 Göttingen by Ludwig Prandtl founded "Modellversuchsanstalt für Aerodynamik der Motorluftschiff-Studiengesellschaft". In its founding years, it was still concerned with the development of the "best" form of airship. In 1908, the first wind tunnel was built in Göttingen for tests on models for aviation. In 1915, founded in 1911 Kaiser Wilhelm Society (KWG) and under the direction of Ludwig Prandtl the "Modellversuchsanstalt aerodynamics" was founded in 1919 as the "Aerodynamic Research Institute of the Kaiser Wilhelm Society" (AVA) was transferred to the KWG and converted in 1925 into the "Kaiser Wilhelm Institute for Flow Research linked to the Aerodynamic Research Institute".

Ludwig Prandtl headed the institute until 1937, his successor became Albert Betz. In the same year a spin-off from the institute took place under the name "Aerodynamische Versuchsanstalt Göttingen e. V. in the Kaiser Wilhelm Society ", in which the Reich Ministry of Aviation was involved. The remaining after the spin-off part was continued under the name "Kaiser Wilhelm Institute for Flow Research" from the 1948, the Max Planck Institute for Fluid Research (today Max Planck Institute for Dynamics and Self-Organization).

The AVA was confiscated in 1945 by the British (until 1948), 1953 as "Aerodynamic Research Institute Göttingen e. V. re-opened in the Max Planck Society and fully integrated in 1956 as the "Aerodynamic Research Institute in the Max Planck Society".

In 1969, the spin-off from the Max Planck Society and the founding of the "German Research and Experimental Institute for Aerospace e. V.".

== Bibliography ==
- Aerodynamische Versuchsanstalt Göttingen e.V. in der Kaiser-Wilhelm-/Max-Planck-Gesellschaft (CPTS), in: Eckart Henning, Marion Kazemi: Handbuch zur Institutsgeschichte der Kaiser-Wilhelm-/ Max-Planck-Gesellschaft zur Förderung der Wissenschaften 1911–2011 – Daten und Quellen, Berlin 2016, 2 subvolumes, volume 1: Institute und Forschungsstellen A–L (online, PDF, 75 MB), pages 27–45 (Chronologie des Instituts)

== Sources ==
- Historie des DLR – Gesellschaft von Freunden des DLR e. V.
- 100 Jahre DLR – Homepage des DLR
- Archiv zur Geschichte der Max-Planck-Gesellschaft
