= German Society for Aeronautics and Astronautics =

German aerospace society

- Deutsche Gesellschaft für Luft- und Raumfahrt - Lilienthal-Oberth e.V.
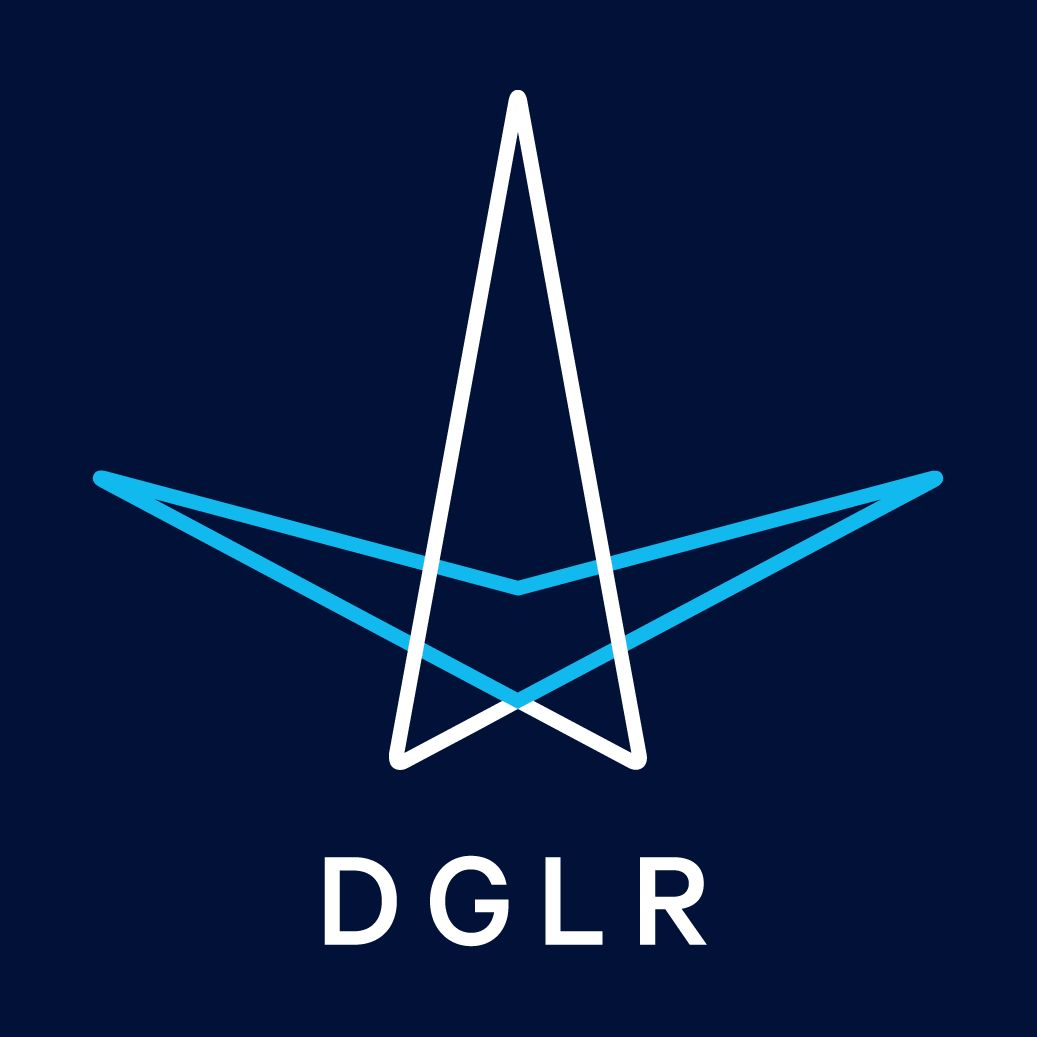
- Abbreviation: DGLR
- Formation: 3 April 1912
- Type: Non-profit registered association
- Purpose: Advancement in the field of aerospace
- Headquarters: Bonn
- Members: 3000
- Official language: German
- Secretary General: Philip Nickenig
- President: Roland Gerhards
- Website: www.dglr.de

German Society for Aeronautics and Astronautics (DGLR; German: Deutsche Gesellschaft für Luft- und Raumfahrt - Lilienthal-Oberth e.V.) is a German aerospace society. It was founded in 1912 under the name of Wissenschaftliche Gesellschaft für Flugtechnik (WGF). It is the second oldest technical and scientific society in aerospace in the world.

== Overview ==
The German Society for Aeronautics and Astronautics (Deutsche Gesellschaft für Luft- und Raumfahrt; DGLR) is the oldest institution in Germany to offer a common forum for those with a private or professional interest in aeronautics and spaceflight. The Society offers a network for knowledge exchange about the aerospace sector; current projects and developments are presented, and good ideas are nurtured and rewarded.

DGLR is the only technical and scientific association for aviation and spaceflight in Germany. Its members represent industry, government, education and research institutions. It acts as a link between every discipline and hence encourages a comprehensive exchange of information and experience. Beyond its function as a provider of information for its members, DGLR acts as a representative of aeronautics and spaceflight for the general public – nationally and internationally.

DGLR combines varying areas of expertise and specialist committees into a network of skill sets. Here, members can pursue their individual areas of interest and connect with like-minded people. Regional groups offer the option of networking at a local level. At events, members have the opportunity to network and catch up on recent developments. For example, every year the German Aerospace Conference (Deutsche Luft- und Raumfahrtkongress; DLRK) acts as a central national forum for aeronautics and spaceflight.

Encouragement of new talent in science and technology is a core objective of DGLR. Through the Skyfuture online information portal, it offers contacts and guidance in training, study and career options in the aerospace sector. DGLR also helps student trainee groups carry out their own projects at universities.

== History ==
The society was founded in Berlin on April 3, 1912 under the name Wissenschaftliche Gesellschaft für Flugtechnik e. V. (WGF). This makes it the world's second oldest technical and scientific society for aviation and aerospace. The society already had 300 members in its first year.

In 1914, the WGF was renamed Wissenschaftliche Gesellschaft für Luftfahrt (WGL). Ludwig Prandtl, who was already involved in the founding of the society, was commissioned to set up scientific and technical committees, e.g. for engines, aerodynamics, aerology, etc., which can still be found in the structure of the society today.

By 1929, the number of members had risen to over 800, and important aviation scientists such as Junkers, Oberth and Dornier gave lectures at annual general meetings. As early as 1928, the first lectures on space travel and rocket flight were added. In 1936, the WGL was dissolved and its members became part of the newly founded Lilienthalgesellschaft für Luftfahrtforschung.

From 1945 to 1952, all aviation activities were banned in Germany. It was not until April 21, 1952 that the Wissenschaftliche Gesellschaft für Luftfahrt was re-established. The society's highest award was the Ludwig-Prandtl-Ring, which was awarded to national and international scientists, thus establishing and strengthening relations with foreign societies and helping the WGL to gain international recognition.

In 1962, the WGL was renamed the Wissenschaftliche Gesellschaft für Luft- und Raumfahrt e. V. (WGLR - Scientific Society for Aeronautics and Astronautics) in order to cover all future problems of the emerging space travel and technology.

At the same time, from 1923 onwards, the space travel movement developed in Germany, triggered by publications by the physicist and later rocket pioneer Hermann Oberth. The Verein für Raumschifffahrt e. V. was founded and established the first German rocket airfield in Berlin in 1932. The association was dissolved in 1934 and the Gesellschaft für Weltraumforschung e. V., Berlin (GfW) was founded. Hermann Oberth was honorary president of the GfW from 1948, which was renamed Deutsche Gesellschaft für Raketentechnik und Raumfahrt e. V. (DGRR) in 1956.

In 1967 it was decided that the DGRR and the WGLR should be represented in one association in future. This led to the merger of the two associations to form the German Society for Aeronautics and Astronautics (DGLR).

From 1990, negotiations began to merge the DGLR with the Hermann-Oberth-Gesellschaft (HOG), the Gesellschaft für Weltraumforschung und Raumfahrt (GWR) and the Fachverband Luftfahrt (FL) into one society. Thus, 1993, the German Society for Aeronautics and Astronautics - Lilienthal-Oberth e. V. (DGLR) was founded.

== Association structure ==
The members of the DGLR have the opportunity to actively shape the affairs of the Society. They can participate in the annual general meeting, vote on important issues and help decide who is elected to the DGLR Senate. The Senate in turn elects the Presidium, which ultimately appoints the Secretary General of the DGLR office. Since 2019, there is also a Young Senate, which represents DGLR’s young members. Their main task is to recruit and promote new young members and support their networking within the DGLR.

Regionally, members can join and shape those DGLR district groups that are responsible for their region in Germany. Within the district groups, a leader and their deputies are elected by the group’s members for three years. The district groups not only promote the aims of the Society but also strengthen its internal and regional cohesion.

The DGLR is divided into expert committees in the fields of aeronautics, space and cross-cutting issues that provide information on perspective development directions in the different areas of aerospace. In symposia, seminars, lectures and workshops organised by the expert committees, they provide relevant and current information on the aeronautics and space sector.

One of DGLR's core tasks is to promote young professionals. To this end, it brings together young, committed and inquisitive people and enables them to network with potential employers. Young researchers at universities, colleges, universities of applied sciences and other institutions are also promoted in the form of student trainee groups – scientific research groups of students who permanently work together on aerospace-related projects.

== German Aerospace Congress ==
The DGLR has been organizing the German Aerospace Congress (DLRK - Deutscher Luft- und Raumfahrtkongress) every year since 1952. It serves as a platform for the exchange of experience among current and future experts in the field of aerospace. The DLRK has been established as a networking event in the aerospace industry for decades and welcomes around 1000 participants every year.

The DGLR also participates in many other national and international aerospace events and organizes smaller events at district level.

== Membership ==
Persons interested in aerospace can register as full members and thus benefit from the services of the society. Industrial companies, associations, clubs and other organizations active or involved in aerospace can become corporate members of the DGLR.

The DGLR itself is a voting member of the International Astronautical Federation (IAF) and the International Council of the Aeronautical Sciences (ICAS). It is one of the four founding members of the Council of European Aerospace Societies (CEAS) and has been working with the American Institute of Aeronautics and Astronautics (AIAA) for many years.

== Awards ==
The following awards are given out by DGLR for outstanding contributions:

- Ludwig-Prandtl-Ring
- Raumfahrtmedaille der DGLR (until 2022: Eugen-Sänger-Medaille)
- Otto-Lilienthal-Medaille
- Ehrennadel der deutschen Luftfahrt
- Ehrennadel der deutschen Raumfahrt (until 2019: Wernher-von Braun-Ehrung)
- Manfred-Fuchs-Ehrung
- Honorary Member
- Young Talents Awards

== See also ==
- German Aerospace Center
