= Royal Aeronautical Society =

British multi-disciplinary professional institution

- Abbreviation: RAeS
- Formation: January 1866; 160 years ago
- Type: Professional institution
- Legal status: Non-profit company
- Location(s): 4 Hamilton Place, London, W1; United kingdom
- Region served: Worldwide
- Chief Executive: David Edwards FRAeS
- Main organ: Board of Trustees
- Affiliations: Engineering Council
- Website: aerosociety.com

The Royal Aeronautical Society, also known as the RAeS, is a British multi-disciplinary professional institution dedicated to the global aerospace community. Founded in 1866, it is the oldest aeronautical society in the world. Members, Fellows, and Companions of the society can use the post-nominal letters MRAeS, FRAeS, or CRAeS, respectively.

== Function ==
The objectives of The Royal Aeronautical Society include: to support and maintain high professional standards in aerospace disciplines; to provide a unique source of specialist information and a local forum for the exchange of ideas; and to exert influence in the interests of aerospace in the public and industrial arenas, including universities.

The Royal Aeronautical Society is a worldwide society with an international network of 67 branches. Many practitioners of aerospace disciplines use the Society's designatory post-nominals such as FRAeS, CRAeS, MRAeS, AMRAeS, and ARAeS (incorporating the former graduate grade, GradRAeS).

The RAeS headquarters is at 4 Hamilton Place, London, W1J 7BQ. In addition to offices for its staff the building is used for Society events and parts of the building are available for private hire.

=== Publications ===
- The Journal of the Royal Aeronautical Society: ISSN 0368-3931 (1923–1967)
- The Aeronautical Quarterly: (1949–1983)
- Aerospace: (1969–1997)
- Aerospace International: ISSN 1467-5072 (1997–2013)
- The Aerospace Professional: (1998–2013)
- The Aeronautical Journal: ISSN 0001-9240 (1897 to date)
- The Journal of Aeronautical History: (2011 to date)
- AEROSPACE: ISSN 2052-451X (2013 to date)
- Briefing Papers and Reports (2015 to date)
- Consultation Responses (2015 to date)

== Branches and divisions ==
Branches deliver membership benefits and disseminate aerospace information. As of September 2013, branches located in the United Kingdom include: Belfast, Birmingham, Boscombe Down, Bristol, Brough, Cambridge, Cardiff, Chester, Christchurch, Coventry, Cranfield, Cranwell, Derby, FAA Yeovilton, Farnborough, Gatwick, Gloucester & Cheltenham, Hatfield, Heathrow, Highland, Isle of Wight, Isle of Man, Loughborough, Manchester, Marham, Medway, Oxford, Preston, Prestwick, Sheffield, Solent, Southend, Stevenage, Swindon, Weybridge, and Yeovil.

The RAeS international branch network includes: Adelaide, Auckland, Blenheim, Brisbane, Brussels, Canberra, Canterbury, Cyprus, Dublin, Hamburg, Hamilton, Hong Kong, Malaysia, Melbourne, Montreal, Munich, Palmerston North, Paris, Perth, Seattle, Singapore, Sydney, Toulouse, and the UAE.

Divisions of the Society have been formed in countries and regions that can sustain a number of Branches. Divisions operate with a large degree of autonomy, being responsible for their own branch network, membership recruitment, subscription levels, conference and lecture programmes.

Specialist Groups covering various facets of the aerospace industry exist under the overall umbrella of the Society, with the aim of serving the interests of both enthusiasts and industry professionals. Their remit is to consider significant developments in their field through conferences and lectures, with the intention of stimulating debate and facilitating action on key industry issues. The Groups also act as focal points for all enquiries to the Society concerning their specialist subject matter.

As of September 2013, the Specialist Group committees are: Aerodynamics, Aerospace Medicine, Air Power, Air Law, Air Transport, Airworthiness & Maintenance, Avionics & Systems, Environment, Flight Operations, Flight Simulation, Flight Test, General Aviation, Greener by Design, Historical, Human Factors, Human Powered Flight, Propulsion, Rotorcraft, Space, Structures & Materials, UAS, Weapons Systems & Technologies, and Women in Aviation & Aerospace.

In 2009, the Royal Aeronautical Society formed a group of experts to document how to better simulate aircraft upset conditions, and thus improve training programmes.

== History ==
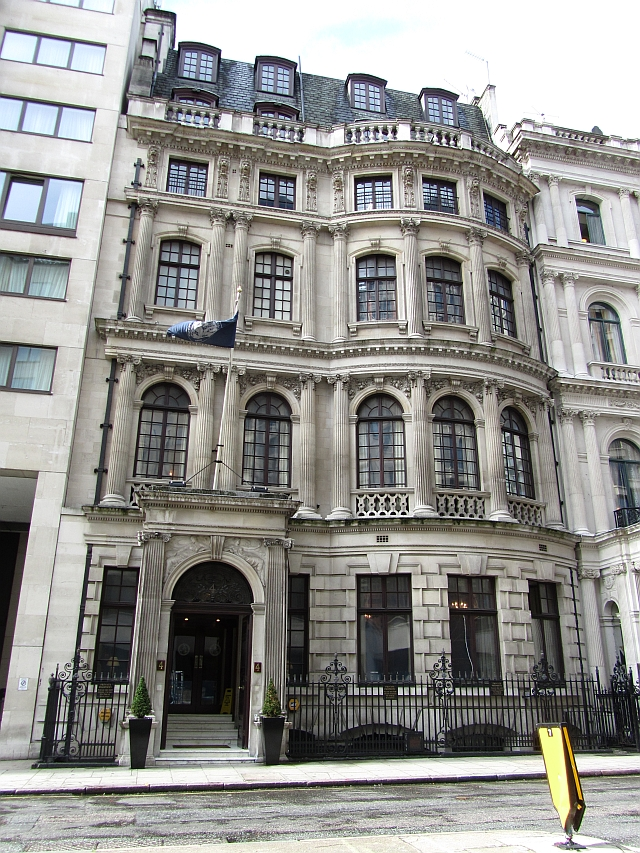
The Society's headquarters at No.4 Hamilton Place in London

The Society was founded in January 1866 with the name "The Aeronautical Society of Great Britain" and is the oldest aeronautical society in the world. Early or founding members included James Glaisher, Francis Wenham, the Duke of Argyll, and Frederick Brearey. In the first year, there were 65 members, at the end of the second year, 91 members, and in the third year, 106 members. Annual reports were produced in the first decades. In 1868 the Society held a major exhibition at London's Crystal Palace with 78 entries. John Stringfellow's steam engine was shown there. The Society sponsored the first wind tunnel in 1870–71, designed by Wenham and Browning.

In 1918, the organisation's name was changed to the Royal Aeronautical Society.

In 1923 its principal journal was renamed from The Aeronautical Journal to The Journal of the Royal Aeronautical Society and in 1927 the Institution of Aeronautical Engineers Journal was merged into it.

In 1940, the RAeS responded to the wartime need to expand the aircraft industry. The Society established a Technical Department to bring together the best available knowledge and present it in an authoritative and accessible form – a working tool for engineers who might come from other industries and lack the specialised knowledge required for aircraft design. This technical department became known as the Engineering Sciences Data Unit (ESDU) and eventually became a separate entity in the 1980s.

In 1987 the 'Society of Licensed Aircraft Engineers and Technologists', previously called the 'Society of Licensed Aircraft Engineers' was incorporated into the Royal Aeronautical Society.

== Presidents ==
The following have served as President of the Royal Aeronautical Society:

- 1886–95 George Campbell, 8th Duke of Argyll
- 1895–00 (None)
- 1900–07 B. Baden-Powell
- 1907–08 (None)
- 1908–11 E. P. Frost
- 1911–19 (None)
- 1919–26 William Weir, 1st Viscount Weir
- 1926–27 Air Vice Marshal Sir William Sefton Brancker
- 1927–30 W Forbes-Sempill
- 1930–34 C. R. Fairey
- 1934–36 J. Moore-Brabazon
- 1936–38 H. E. Wimperis
- 1938–40 R. Fedden
- 1940–42 G. Brewer
- 1942–44 A. Gouge
- 1944–45 Sir Roy Fedden
- 1945–47 F. H. Page
- 1947–49 H. R. Cox
- 1949–50 J. Buchanan
- 1950–51 G. P. Bulman
- 1951–52 F. B. Halford
- 1952–53 G. Dowty
- 1953–54 Sir William Farren
- 1954–55 S. Camm
- 1955–56 N. E. Rowe
- 1956–57 E. T. Jones
- 1957–58 G. R. Edwards
- 1958–59 A. A. Hall
- 1959–60 P. G. Masefield
- 1960–61 E. S. Moult
- 1961–62 R. O. Jones
- 1962–63 B. S. Shenstone
- 1963–64 A. R. Collar
- 1964–65 H.H Gardner
- 1965–66 Sir George Gardner
- 1966- Honorary President Prince Philip, Duke of Edinburgh
- 1966–67 A.D Baxter
- 1967–68 M.B Morgan
- 1968–69 David Keith-Lucas
- 1969–70 F. R. Banks
- 1970–71 Air Commodore J.R Morgan
- 1971–72 S.D Davies
- 1972–73 K.G Wilkinson
- 1973–74 Dr G.S Hislop
- 1974–75 B.P Laight
- 1975–76 Air Marshal Sir Charles Pringle
- 1976–77 C. Abell
- 1977–78 Handel Davies
- 1978–79 Professor L.F Crabtree
- 1979–80 R.P Probert
- 1980–81 P.A Hearne
- 1981–82 J.T Stamper
- 1982–83 Captain E.M Brown
- 1983–84 Professor M.G Farley
- 1984–85 Geoffrey Pardoe
- 1985–86 Thomas Kerr
- 1986–87 John Fozard
- 1987–88 John Stollery
- 1988–89 Dr P.H Calder
- 1989–90 Dr H. Metcalfe
- 1990–91 G.C Howell
- 1991–92 G.M McCoombe
- 1992–93 Air Marshal Sir Frank Holroyd
- 1993–94 Dr G.G Pope
- 1994–95 Sir C.B.G Masefield
- 1995–96 Sir Donald Spiers
- 1996–97 Professor John Green
- 1997–98 Stewart M John
- 1998–99 Captain W.D Lowe
- 1999–00 Lanthony Edwards
- 2000–01 Trevor Trueman
- 2001–02 Professor Ian Poll
- 2002–03 Lee Balthazor
- 2003–04 Air Marshal Sir Peter Norriss
- 2004–05 Roland Fairfield
- 2005–06 Air Marshal Sir Colin Terry
- 2006–07 Gordon F. Page
- 2007–08 David Marshall
- 2008–09 Captain David Rowland
- 2009–10 Dr. Mike Steeden
- 2010–11 Air Vice-Marshal David Couzens
- 2011–12 Lee Balthazor
- 2012–13 Phil Boyle
- 2013–14 Jenny Body
- 2014–15 Air Commodore Bill Tyack
- 2015–16 Martin Broadhurst
- 2016 Honorary President Charles, Prince of Wales
- 2016–17 Professor Chris Atkin
- 2017–18 Sir Stephen Dalton FRAeS
- 2018–19 Rear Adm Simon Henley CEng FRAeS
- 2019–21 Professor Jonathan Cooper
- 2021–22 Howard Nye MInstP FRAeS
- 2022–23 Air Cdre Peter Round FRAeS
- 2023–24 Kerissa Khan MRAeS
- 2024–25 David Chinn FRAeS
- 2025-26 Dr Alisdair Wood FRAeS
- 2026-27 Professor Malcolm Macdonald FRAeS

== Chief Executives ==
- Keith Mans was chief executive from 1998–2009
- Simon Luxmoore was chief executive from 2009–2018
- Sir Brian Burridge CBE FRAeS, from 1 October 2018
- David Edwards FRAeS, from 1 October 2021

== Honors ==
In addition to the award of Fellowship of the Royal Aeronautical Society (FRAeS) – the society's highest membership grade – the RAeS awards several other medals and prizes. These include its Gold, Silver, and Bronze medals. The very first gold medal was awarded in 1909 to the Wright Brothers. Although it is unusual for more than one medal (in each of the three grades) to be awarded annually, since 2004 the Society has also periodically awarded team medals (Gold, Silver, and Bronze) for exceptional or groundbreaking teamwork in aeronautical research and development. Others awarded have included the R. P. Alston Memorial Prize for developments in flight-testing, the Edward Busk prize for applied aerodynamics, the Wakefield Medal for advances in aviation safety, and an Orville Wright Prize. Honorary Fellowships and Honorary Companionships are awarded as well.

The Sir Robert Hardingham Sword is awarded in recognition of outstanding service to the RAeS by a member of the Society. Nominally an annual award, in practice the award is only made about one year in two.

=== Gold Medal ===
Notable Gold Medal recipients include:

- 1909 – Wilbur and Orville Wright
- 1910 – Octave Chanute
- 1945 – Air Cdre Frank Whittle
- 1950 – Sir Geoffrey de Havilland
- 1955 – Ernest Hives, 1st Baron Hives
- 1958 – Sydney Camm
- 1959 – Marcel Dassault
- 1960 – Sir Frederick Handley Page
- 1977 – George Lee
- 1983 – Geoffrey Lilley
- 1993 – Reimar Horten
- 2012 – Elon Musk
- 2018 – Peter Beck

=== Honorary Fellows ===
- 1950 Sir Thomas Sopwith
- 1953 The Duke of Edinburgh
- 1954 Air Commodore Sir Frank Whittle
- 1957 The Prince of The Netherlands
- 1959 Professor J. Ackeret
- 1960 Sir George Edwards
- 1962 N. E. Rowe
- 1963 Sir Alfred Pugsley
- 1964 Sir Denning Pearson
- 1965 Sir Arnold Hall
- 1969 Dr R. R. Gilruth
- 1969 Lord Kings Norton
- 1969 Sir Archibald Russell
- 1970 Sir Robert Cockburn
- 1971 Professor Sydney Goldstein
- 1974 S. D. Davies
- 1975 C. Abell
- 1975 H. A. L. Ziegler
- 1976 Sir Keith Granville
- 1977 Sir William Hawthorne
- 1978 The Prince of Wales
- 1978 Dr O. Nagano
- 1978 Dr W. Tye
- 1979 Professor D. Keith-Lucas
- 1980 E. H. Heinemann
- 1980 Sir Frederick Page
- 1980 Sir Peter Masefield
- 1981 Sir Robert Hunt
- 1982 H. Davies
- 1983 Dr G. S. Hislop
- 1983 Professor Dipl-Ing G. Madelung
- 1983 R. H. Beteille
- 1984 J. T. Stamper
- 1984 Professor A. D. Young
- 1984 Sir Philip Foreman
- 1985 J. F. Sutter
- 1985 King Hussein of Jordan
- 1985 Sir Roy Sisson
- 1986 Professor J. H. Argyris
- 1986 Dr K. G. Wilkinson
- 1987 F. Cereti
- 1988 Professor H. Ashley
- 1988 G. P. Dollimore
- 1989 Admiral Sir Raymond Lygo
- 1989 Air Marshal Sir Charles Pringle
- 1989 F. d' Allest
- 1990 P. A. Hearne
- 1990 Sir James Lighthill
- 1991 Sir Ralph Robins
- 1992 Professor Em Dr-Ing K. H. Doetsch
- 1992 Sir John Charnley
- 1992 G. H. Lee
- 1993 The Duke of Kent
- 1993 Professor Dr.-Ing. B. J. Habibie
- 1993 R. W. Howard
- 1994 Baroness Platt of Writtle
- 1994 Lord Tombs of Brailes
- 1994 S. Gillibrand
- 1995 C. H. Kaman
- 1995 Professor J. L. Stollery
- 1995 R. W. R. McNulty
- 1996 P. M. Condit
- 1996 Sir Richard H. Evans
- 1997 J. Pierson
- 1997 N. Augustine
- 1997 J. Cunningham
- 1998 M. Flanagan
- 1998 R. Belyakov
- 1998 R. Yates
- 1998 S. Ajaz Ali
- 1999 A. Caporaletti
- 1999 D. Burrell
- 2000 N. Barber
- 2000 Professor Ing E. Vallerani
- 2000 R. Collette
- 2000 Sir Donald Spiers
- 2001 A. Welch OBE
- 2001 Dr B. Halse
- 2001 J. Bechat
- 2001 Sir Arthur Marshall OBE
- 2001 Richard Manson
- 2002 A Mulally
- 2003 P Ruffles
- 2003 Prof. Sir John Horlock
- 2003 J. Thomas
- 2004 Captain Eric Brown
- 2004 Alain Garcia
- 2005 Sir Michael Cobham
- 2006 General Charles E. Yeager
- 2006 Air Vice-Marshal Professor R.A. Mason
- 2008 Edward George Nicholas Paul Patrick Kent
- 2008 Professor Beric Skews
- 2008 Norman Barber
- 2008 Philip Murray Condit
- 2008 Ralph Robins
- 2008 Rene Collette
- 2008 Richard Harry Evans
- 2008 Roy McNulty
- 2009 William Kenneth Maciver CBE
- 2009 Gordon Page CBE
- 2012 Ing S Pancotti
- 2012 Professor M Gaster
- 2013 Professor K Ridgway CBE
- 2013 Professor R J Stalker
- 2014 C P Smith CBE
- 2014 Professor B Cheng
- 2014 J-P Herteman
- 2014 Colin Smith
- 2014 Jean-Paul Herteman
- 2014 John Balfour
- 2014 Keith Ridgway
- 2014 Michael Gaster
- 2014 Santino Pancotti
- 2015 Professor Sir Martin Sweeting OBE
- 2015 J-J Dordain
- 2015 Professor R K Agarwal
- 2016 P Fabre
- 2016 Sir Michael Marshall CBE
- 2016 Major T N Peake CMG
- 2016 Dr D W Richardson
- 2016 M J Ryan CBE
- 2016 Jean-Jacques Dordain
- 2016 Martin Sweeting
- 2016 Michael Ryan
- 2016 Pierre Fabre
- 2016 Ramesh Agarwal
- 2016 Timothy Peake
- 2017 Professor R Bor
- 2018 Major General Desmond Barker
- 2018 M Bryson CBE
- 2018 Francis R Donaldson
- 2018 Marcus Bryson
- 2018 Colonel Joseph W Kittinger Jr
- 2019 Dr G. Satheesh Reddy
- 2019 Asad Madni
- 2019 G Satheesh Reddy
- 2019 Alexander Smits
- 2019 Ashwani Gupta
- 2019 Fabio Nannoni
- 2020 Meyer Benzakein
- 2020 Tom Williams
- 2020 Trevor Birch
- 2021 Gwynne Shotwell
- 2021 Jim Bridenstine
- 2021 Johann-Dietrich Wörner
- 2021 John Tracy
- 2021 Paul Kaminski
- 2021 Paul Nielsen
- 2021 Robert Winn
- 2022 Colin Paynter
- 2022 Jonathan Cooper
- 2022 Tewolde Tewolde
- 2024 Balakumar Balachandran
- 2024 Group Captain Peter Hackett MBE

=== Honorary Companions ===
- 1938 Agnes Baden-Powell
- 1961 Sir John Toothill
- 1963 Lord Wilberforce
- 1965 L. A. Wingfield
- 1966 J. Davison
- 1973 Lord Elworthy
- 1975 H. Kremer
- 1975 Sir R. Verdon-Smith
- 1978 J. R. Stainton
- 1979 Lord Keith of Castleacre
- 1980 Sir Arthur Marshall
- 1982 Sir Douglas Lowe
- 1983 L. C. Hunting
- 1985 Lord King of Wartnaby
- 1985 F. A. A. Wootton
- 1986 G. Pattie
- 1987 Sir Norman Payne
- 1988 Sir Colin Marshall
- 1989 Air Chief Marshal Sir Peter Harding
- 1989 M. D. Bishop
- 1990 T. Mayer
- 1991 R. F. Baxter
- 1991 Sir Adrian Swire
- 1992 Dr T. A. Ryan
- 1993 Sir Richard Branson
- 1994 Professor C. J. Pennycuick
- 1995 Air Marshal M. Nur Khan
- 1996 Sir Neil Cossons
- 1997 A. J. Goldman
- 1997 R. D. Lapthorne
- 1998 P. Martin
- 1999 Sheikh Hamdan bin Mubarak Al Nahyan
- 2000 Sheikh Ahmed Bin Saeed Al Maktoum
- 2002 J Travolta
- 2002 R Turnill
- 2003 Dr C C Kong
- 2008 Ahmed Bin Saeed Al Maktoum
- 2008 Michael David Bishop
- 2008 Neil Cossons
- 2008 Richard Charles Nicholas Branson
- 2010 Giovanni Bisignani
- 2014 Philip Jarrett
- 2015 David Bent
- 2016 Charles Clarke
- 2016 David Bent
- 2016 Elizabeth Hughes
- 2016 Roger Bone
- 2020 Idris Ben-Tahir
- 2020 Jeffrey Shane
- 2022 Michael Turner
- 2024 C Matthews

=== Named Lectures ===
==== Henson & Stringfellow Lecture and Dinner ====
The annual Henson & Stringfellow Lecture and Dinner is hosted yearly by the Yeovil Branch of the Royal Aeronautical Society, held at Westland Leisure Complex, and is a key social and networking event of the Yeovil lecture season. It is a black tie event attracting over 200 guests drawn from all sectors of the aerospace community.

John Stringfellow created, alongside William Samuel Henson, the first powered flight aircraft, developed in Chard, Somerset, which flew unmanned in 1848, 63 years prior to brothers Wilbur & Orville Wrights' flight.

==== Wilbur & Orville Wright Named Lecture ====
The Wilbur & Orville Wright Named Lecture was established in 1911 to honour the Wright brothers, the successful and experienced mechanical engineers who completed the first successful controlled powered flight on 17 December 1903. The Wilbur & Orville Wright Lecture is the principal event in the Society's year, given by distinguished members of the US and UK aerospace communities.

The 99th Lecture was given by Piers Sellers, astronaut, on 9 December 2010 at the Society's Headquarters in London.

The 100th Lecture was given by Suzanna Darcy-Henneman, Chief Pilot & Director of Training, Boeing Commercial Airplanes, on 8 December 2011.

The 101st Lecture was given by Tony Parasida, corporate vice president, The Boeing Company, on 20 December 2012.

The 102nd Lecture was given by Thomas Enders, CEO of EADS, on 12 December 2013.

The 103rd Lecture was given by Patrick M Dewar, executive vice president, Lockheed Martin International in December 2014.

The 104th Lecture was given by Nigel Whitehead, Group Managing Director – Programmes and Support, BAE Systems plc in December 2015.

The 105th Lecture was given by ACM Sir Stephen Hillier, Chief of the Air Staff, Royal Air Force on 6 December 2016.

The 106th Lecture was given by Martin Rolfe, chief executive officer, NATS on 5 December 2017.

The 107th Lecture was given by Leanne Caret, Vice President, The Boeing Company and President & CEO, Boeing Defense, Space & Security on 4 December 2018.

The 108th Lecture was given by David Mackay FRAeS, Chief Pilot, Virgin Galactic on 10 December 2019.

==== Amy Johnson Named Lecture ====
The Amy Johnson Named Lecture was inaugurated in 2011 by the Royal Aeronautical Society's Women in Aviation and Aerospace Committee to celebrate a century of women in flight and to honour Britain's most famous woman aviator. The Lecture is held on or close to 6 July every year to mark the date in 1929 when Amy Johnson was awarded her pilot's licence. The Lecture is intended to tackle serious issues of interest to a wide audience, not just women. High-profile women from industry are asked to lecture on a topic that speaks of future challenges of interest to everyone.

Carolyn McCall, chief executive of EasyJet, delivered the Inaugural Lecture on 6 July 2011 at the Society's Headquarters in London.

The second Amy Johnson Named Lecture was delivered by Marion C. Blakey, president and chief executive of Aerospace Industries Association (AIA), on 5 July 2012.

The third Lecture was delivered by Gretchen Haskins, former Group Director of the Safety Regulation Group of the UK Civil Aviation Authority (CAA), on 8 July 2013.

In 2017, Katherine Bennett OBE FRAeS, Senior Vice President Public Affairs, Airbus gave the Amy Johnson Lecture and in 2018 Air Vice-Marshal Sue Gray, CB, OBE from the Royal Air Force gave the Amy Johnson Lecture in honour of the 100th anniversary of the RAF.

==== Sopwith Named Lecture ====
The Sopwith Lecture was established in 1990 to honour Sir Thomas Sopwith CBE, Hon FRAeS. In the years prior to World War I, Sopwith became England's premier aviator and established the first authoritative test pilot school in the world. He also founded England's first major flight school. Between 1912 and 1920 Sopwith's Company produced over 16,000 aircraft of 60 types.

In 2017 the lecture was delivered by Tony Wood, chief operating officer of Meggitt PLC.

In 2018 the lecture was delivered by Group Captain Ian Townsend ADC MA RAF, Station Commander, RAF Marham.

In 2019 the lecture was delivered by Billie Flynn, F-35 Lightning II Test Pilot, Lockheed Martin.

In 2020 the lecture was delivered online by Dirk Hoke, CEO, Airbus Defence & Space.

== In popular culture ==
The July 18th., 1975 edition of the society's Journal included the first use of the misattributed term, "Beam Me Up, Scotty", in a sentence, viz:"...in a sort of, 'Beam me up, Scotty', routine".
