= Jakob Ackeret =

Swiss aeronautical engineer

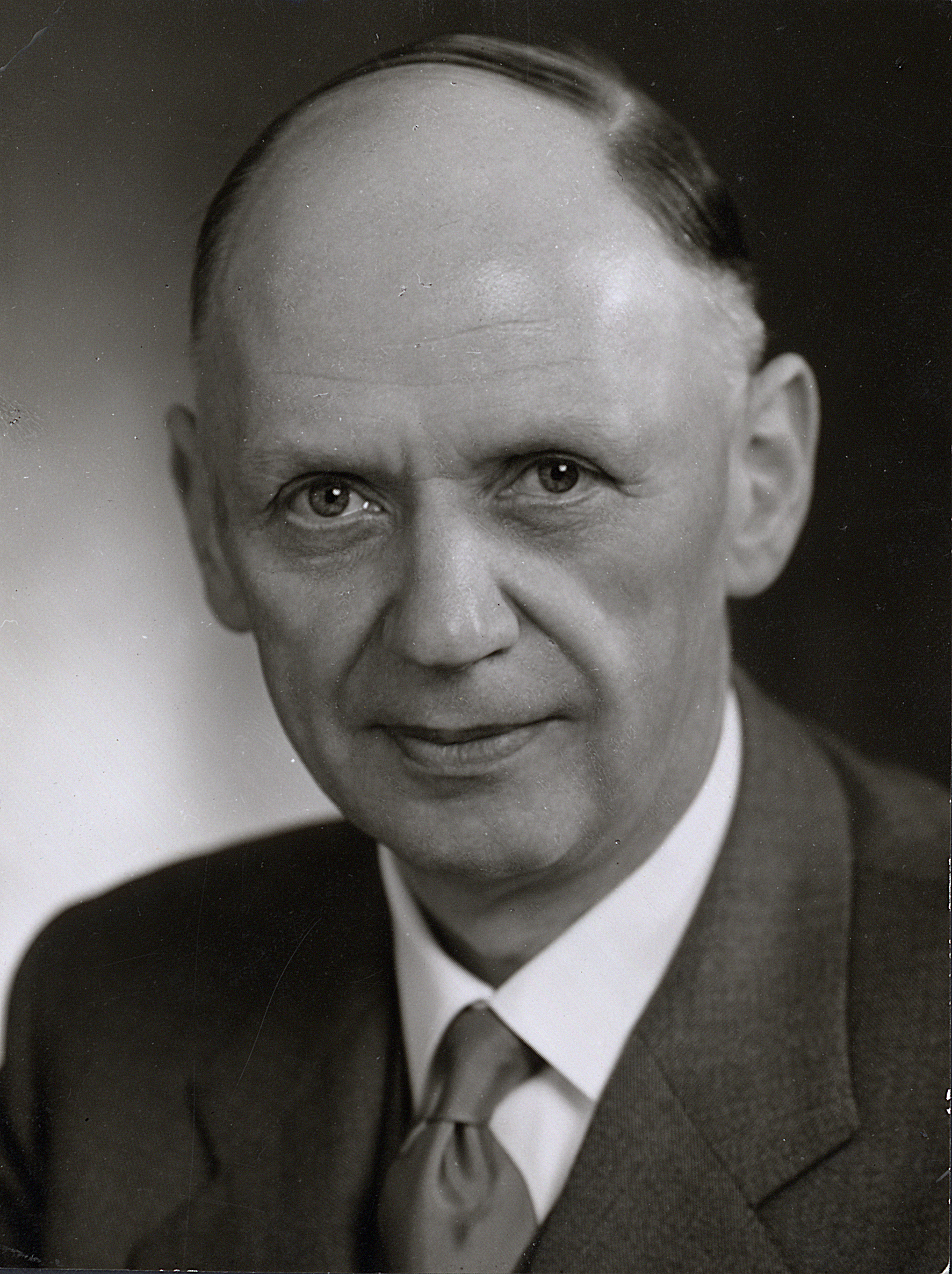
- Jakob Ackeret (1955)
- Born: 17 March 1898; Zurich, Switzerland
- Died: 27 March 1981 (aged 83); Küsnacht, Switzerland
- Citizenship: Swiss
- Education: ETH Zurich
- Awards: ASME Timoshenko Medal (1969); ASME Thurston Lecture Award (1969); Daniel Guggenheim Medal (1970)

Jakob Ackeret, FRAeS (17 March 1898 – 27 March 1981) was a Swiss aeronautical engineer. He is widely viewed as one of the foremost aeronautics experts of the 20th century.

== Birth and education ==
Jakob Ackeret was born in 1898 in Switzerland. He received his diploma degree in mechanical engineering from ETH Zurich in 1920 under the supervision of Aurel Stodola. From 1921 to 1927 he worked with Ludwig Prandtl at the "Aerodynamische Versuchsanstalt" in Göttingen, witnessing a legendary period in the development of modern fluid dynamics. He received his PhD from ETH Zurich in 1927.

== Academic career ==
After completing his PhD, Ackeret worked at Escher Wyss AG in Zurich as chief engineer of hydraulics, where he applied, with great success, modern aerodynamics to the design of turbines.

He became a professor of Aerodynamics at ETH Zurich in 1931, where Wernher von Braun was one of his students.

== Research ==
Ackeret was an expert on gas turbines and was known for his research on propellers and on high-speed propulsion problems.

When he was at ETH Zurich, he actively participated in the solution of practical engineering problems, such as the design of variable-pitch propellers for ships and airplanes. His most important invention was the gas turbine with a closed circuit. He made the invention together with C. Keller.

Ackeret also contributed significantly to research in supersonic aerodynamics. He led the initial work on calculating the lift and drag on a supersonic airfoil and he proposed the designation of the "Mach number" for multiples of the speed of sound. On the 5th Volta Conference in Rome in 1935 Ackeret was planning to talk about supersonic lift, but because of "sensitive developments" for the Luftwaffe Adolf Busemann arranged their topics to be swapped (his paper about swept wings, which seemed an academic curiosity back then, later became seminal) and presented a design for a supersonic wind tunnel.

Ackeret was awarded the Ludwig-Prandtl-Ring from the Deutsche Gesellschaft für Luft- und Raumfahrt (German Society for Aeronautics and Astronautics) for "outstanding contribution in the field of aerospace engineering" in 1965.

In 1976, he was elected foreign associate member of the American National Academy of Engineering for his "contributions to the understanding of high-speed and supersonic fluid mechanics, leading to significant improvements to the science of flight".
