= Adolf Busemann =

German-American aerospace engineer

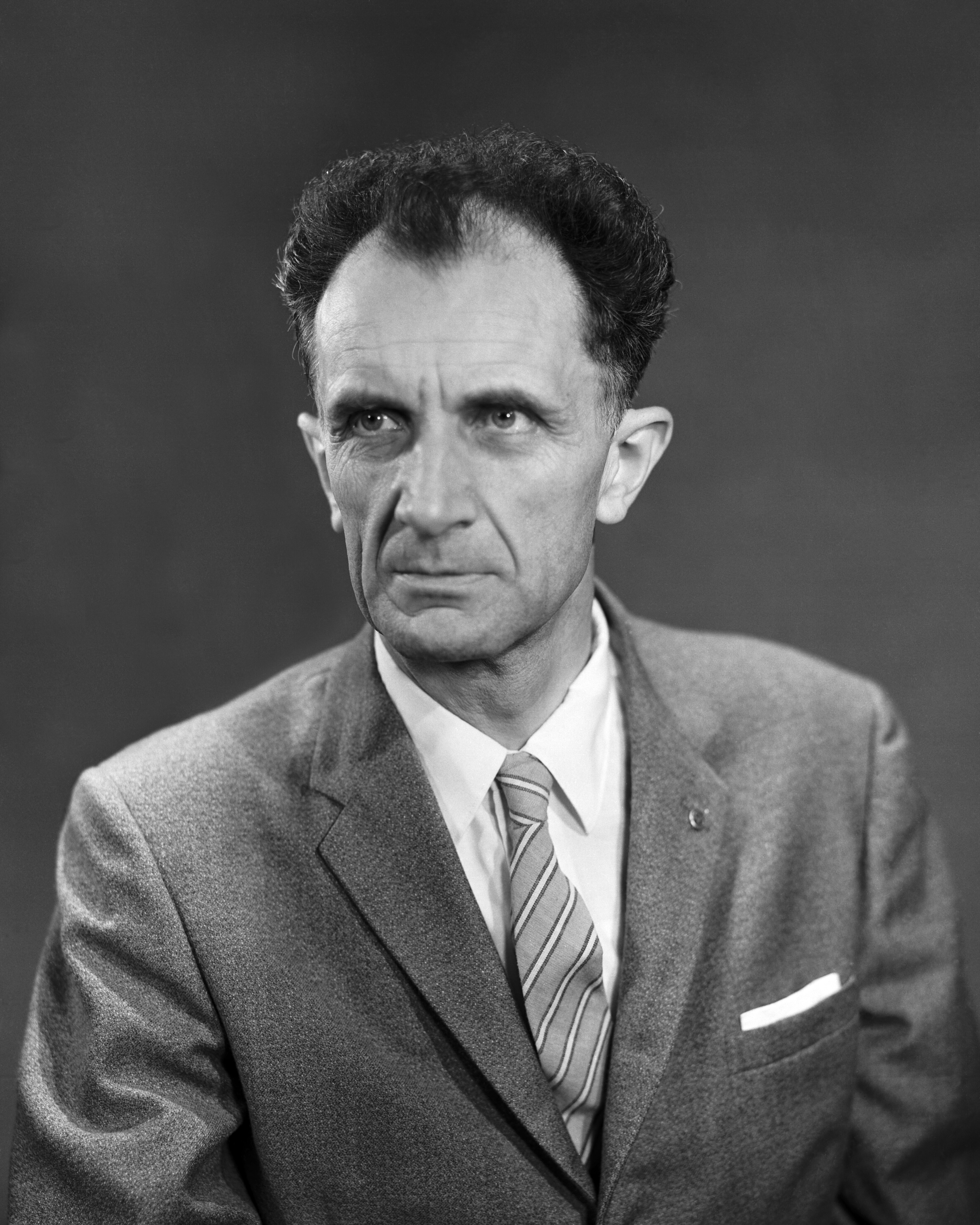
- Adolf Busemann at Langley
- Born: 20 April 1901; Lübeck, Germany
- Died: 3 November 1986 (aged 85); Boulder, Colorado, U.S.
- Education: Technical University of Braunschweig
- Awards: Ludwig Prandtl Ring (1966)
- Scientific career
- Fields: Aerospace engineering
- Workplaces: University of Colorado at Boulder
- Doctoral advisor: Otto Föppl
- Doctoral students: Nguyễn Xuân Vinh

Adolf Busemann (20 April 1901 – 3 November 1986) was a German-American aerospace engineer and influential Nazi-era pioneer in aerodynamics, specialising in supersonic airflows. He introduced the concept of swept wings and, after emigrating in 1947 to the United States under Operation Paperclip, invented the shockwave-free supersonic Busemann biplane.

== Education and early life ==
Born in Lübeck, Germany, Busemann attended the Technical University of Braunschweig, receiving his Ph.D. in engineering in 1924.

== Career and research ==
The next year he was given the position of aeronautical research scientist at the Max-Planck Institute where he joined the famed team led by Ludwig Prandtl, including Theodore von Kármán, Max Munk and Jakob Ackeret. In 1930 he was promoted to professor at University of Göttingen. He held various positions within the German scientific community during this period, and during the war he was the director of the Braunschweig Laboratory, a famous research establishment.

Busemann discovered the benefits of the swept wing for aircraft at high speeds, presenting a paper on the topic at the Fifth Volta Conference in Rome on October 3, 1935, the very day of Italian invasion of Ethiopia which caused a delay of his talk. The paper concerned only supersonic lift. At the time of his proposal, flight much beyond 300 miles per hour had not been achieved and it was considered an academic curiosity (in fact, Busemann was initially planning to present a talk on supersonic wind tunnels, but had to swap topics with Jakob Ackeret because of the "sensitive developments" for the Luftwaffe). Nevertheless, he continued working with the concept, and by the end of the year had demonstrated similar benefits in the transonic region as well, after which the research topic was classified. As director of the Braunschweig labs, he started an experimental wind tunnel test series of the concept, and by 1942 had amassed a considerable amount of useful technical data. As the need for higher speed aircraft became pressing in Germany, the Messerschmitt Me P.1101 was developed to flight test these designs.

When World War II ended, a team of American aerodynamicists travelled to Germany as part of Operation Lusty. The team included Theodore von Kármán, Tsien Hsue-shen, Hugh Dryden and George S. Schairer from Boeing. They reached the Braunschweig labs on 7 May, where they found a mass of data on the swept wing concept. When they asked Busemann about it, "his face lit up" and he said, "Oh, you remember, I read a paper on it at the Volta Conference in 1935". Several members of the team did remember the presentation, but had completely forgotten the details in terms of what the presentation was actually about. Realizing its importance, Schairer immediately wrote to Boeing and told them to investigate the concept, leading to a re-modeling of the B-47 Stratojet with a swept wing. Busemann's work, along with similar work by Robert T. Jones in the US, led to a revolution in aircraft design.

Near the end of the war, Busemann started studying airflow around delta wings, leading to the development of his supersonic conical flow theory. This reduced the complexity of the airflow to a conformal mapping in the complex plane, and was used for some time in the industry.

Busemann moved to the United States in 1947 and started work at NACA's Langley Research Center. In 1951 he gave a talk where he described the fact that air at near supersonic speeds no longer varied in diameter with speed according to Bernoulli's theorem but remained largely incompressible and acting as fixed diameter pipes, or as he put it, 'streampipes'. He jokingly referred to aerodynamicists as needing to become 'pipe fitters'. This talk led an attendee, Richard Whitcomb, to try and work out what these pipes were doing in a transonic test he was performing, inventing the Whitcomb area rule a few days later.

At Langley, he worked primarily on the problems of sonic booms, and spent a considerable amount of effort looking at ways to characterize them, and potentially eliminate them. He later invented Busemann's Biplane, a supersonic design he originally proposed in 1936 that emits no shock waves and has no wave drag, albeit at the cost of having no lift. Busemann also did early work on magneto-hydrodynamics in the 1920s, as well as on cylindrical focusing of shock waves and non-steady gas dynamics.

Busemann held a professorship at the University of Colorado from 1963 and suggested the use of ceramic tiles on the Space Shuttle, which were adopted by NASA.

=== Awards and honors ===
He was awarded the Ludwig-Prandtl-Ring from the Deutsche Gesellschaft für Luft- und Raumfahrt (German Society for Aeronautics and Astronautics) for "outstanding contribution in the field of aerospace engineering" in 1966. He died at age 85 in Boulder, Colorado.
