= Variable Density Tunnel =

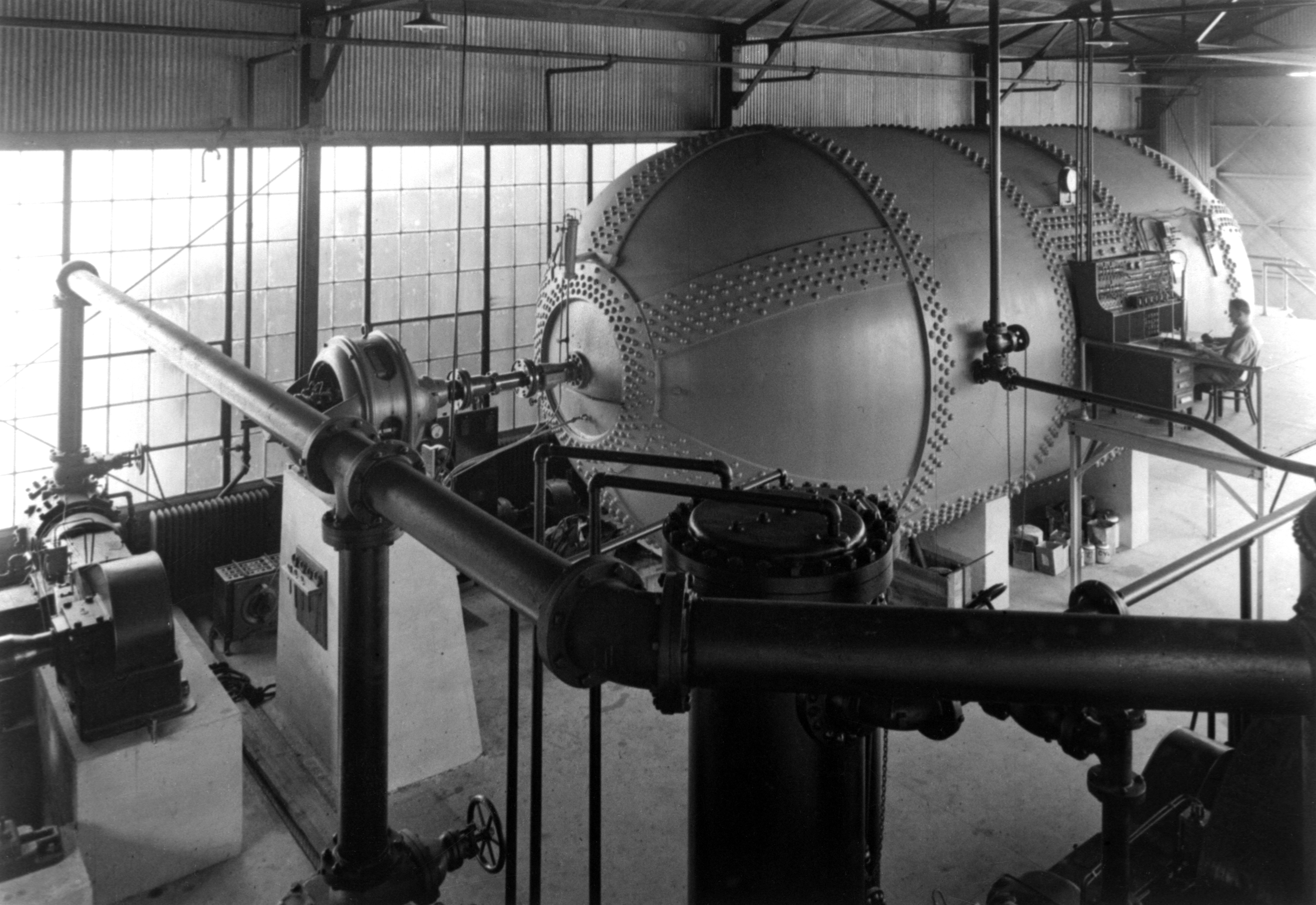
- The Variable Density Tunnel at Langley Research Center with the drive motor (left), compressor piping (front), and an operator (right).
- Acronym: VDT
- Other names: Wind Tunnel No. 2
- Uses: Measuring aerodynamic qualities of airfoils
- Notable experiments: "NACA Technical Report 460: The Characteristics of 78 Related Airfoil Sections from Tests in the Variable-Density Wind Tunnel"
- Inventor: Max Munk
- Manufacturer: Newport News Shipbuilding and Dry Dock Company
- Material: Steel, wood
- Components: Steel pressure shell, air compressor, drive motor, internal test section
- Related items: NACA, Langley Research Center

The Variable Density Tunnel (VDT) was the second wind tunnel at the National Advisory Committee for Aeronautics (NACA) Langley Research Center. Proposed by German aerospace engineer, Max Munk, student of Ludwig Prandtl, it was the world's first variable density wind tunnel and allowed for more accurate testing of small-scale models than could be obtained with atmospheric wind tunnels.

The VDT was actively used as a wind tunnel from 1923 until its retirement in the 1940s. Langley Research Center historian, James R. Hansen, wrote that the VDT provided results superior to the atmospheric wind tunnels used at the time and was responsible for making NACA, the precursor to NASA, "a world leader in aerodynamic research". It is now a National Historic Landmark and is on display on the Langley grounds, near the old Reid Conference Center.

== Technical purpose ==
In order to accurately measure the aerodynamics of scale models, the density of the air used in a wind tunnel must also be scaled to replicate realistic conditions that would affect the full-scale aircraft.

The Reynolds number is a quantification of the complex behaviors of dynamic fluids and is calculated as the ratio of inertia forces to the viscous forces in the flow. The Reynolds number is defined as

$$\mathrm{Re} = \frac{\rho v L}{\mu} = \frac{v L}{\nu}$$

where:

- $\rho$ is the density of the fluid (SI units: kg/m^{3})
- $v$ is the velocity of the fluid with respect to the object (m/s)
- $L$ is a characteristic linear dimension (m)
- $\mu$ is the dynamic viscosity of the fluid (Pa·s or N·s/m^{2} or kg/m·s)
- $\nu$ is the kinematic viscosity of the fluid (m^{2}/s).

The wind tunnels that were used before the creation of the VDT could only operate at normal atmospheric pressures. As a result, scale models in early wind tunnels encountered air with Reynolds numbers that were off by a factor equal to the inverse of the model's scale (i.e. a 1:10 model would be off by a factor of 10). Without properly scaling the Reynolds number, the air flowing over a scale model would react very differently with a full-scale aircraft than it would in a wind tunnel. If a full-scale airfoil is to be simulated in a wind tunnel by a small-scale model, the Reynolds number can only be matched by increasing the velocity or its density or by decreasing its viscosity. The Variable Density Tunnel was designed and built to be pressurized; solving this issue by increasing the density of the air to raise the Reynolds number. The VDT was subsequently able to provide more accurate measurements of aerodynamic qualities because it was able to accurately replicate how air would respond at full-scale.

== History ==
=== Origin ===
In 1920, the National Advisory Committee for Aeronautics brought Max Munk, a German aerospace engineer and student of Ludwig Prandtl at University of Göttingen, to work for them in America. After the end of the First World War, Munk required two presidential orders to work at NACA, and reportedly had difficulty adjusting to NACA's organizational structure, which was not as strictly defined as those in Germany. Regardless, he proposed his revolutionary Variable Density Tunnel design in the same year.

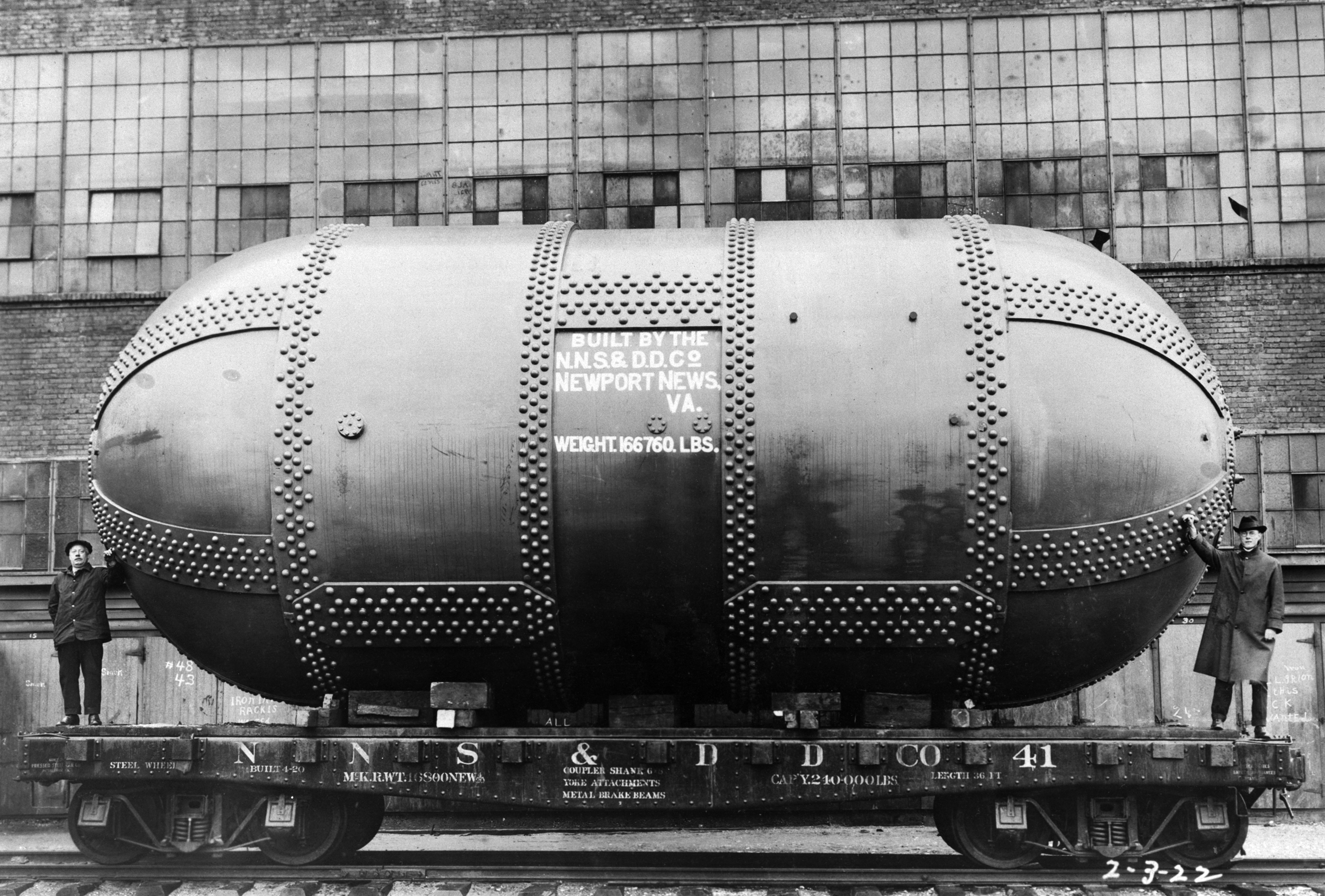
The tank of the Variable Density Tunnel arriving in 1922

The large, steel pressure tank of the VDT was designed with a working pressure up to 20 atmospheres and was constructed by Newport News Shipbuilding and Dry Dock Company in Newport News, Virginia. The tank was 34.5 ft (10.5 m) long and 15 ft (4.6 m) in diameter. The tank's wall was 2 1/8 in (54 mm) thick. The tank required 85 tons (77.3 tonnes) of steel. The test section was 5 ft (1.5 m) in diameter to match an existing NACA Wind Tunnel No. 1, which was an open-circuit tunnel operating at atmospheric pressure. The variable-density wind tunnel had a closed-circuit design with an annular return flow to minimize the volume of the tank. A fan powered by a 250-hp motor could produce an air speed up to 51 mph (82 km/h).

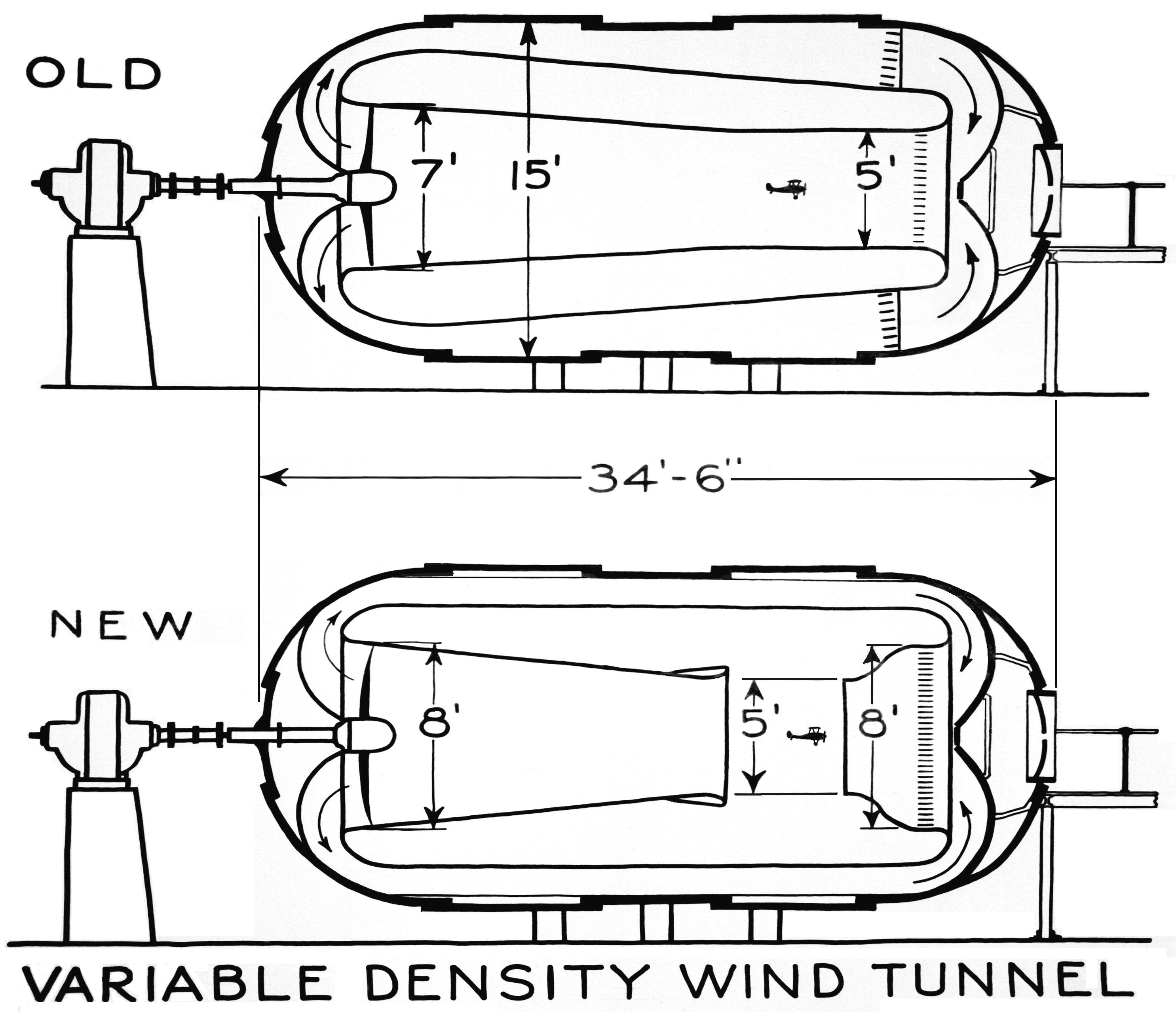
A sectional drawing of original, close-throat test section (top), and the failed, post-fire, open-throat test section from 1927 (bottom).

During a fire in 1927, the internal wooden test section of the VDT was destroyed and was rebuilt with an open-throat design before complications required it be rebuilt again with a closed-throat design. The VDT re-entered service in 1930 and continued to aid the Langley staff in measuring the aerodynamic qualities of airfoils until it was deemed obsolete in the 1940s and converted into a pressure tank for other wind tunnels. The VDT was decommissioned in 1978 and was declared a National Historic Landmark in 1985 because of its historical influence setting the foundation for the beginning of space flight.

=== Research usage ===
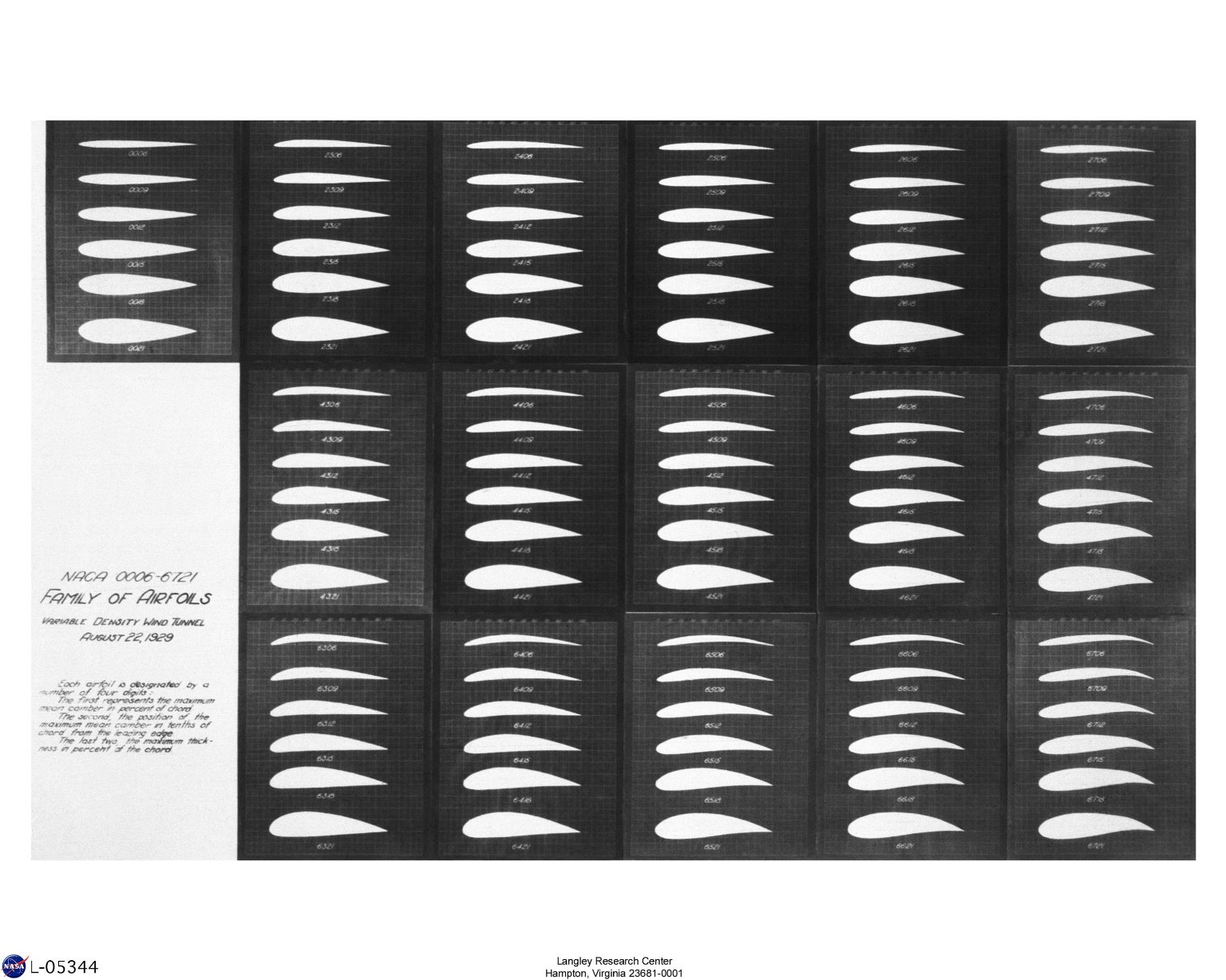
NACA airfoils (NACA 0006 through NACA 6721.) used in NACA Technical Report 460.

The tunnel was used for research for over 20 years, up to the 1940s. The VDT was mainly used to test airfoils as wing design was the most pressing problem in early aeronautics. Notably, the VDT produced the data for 78 classical airfoil shapes that were published in 1933 in "The Characteristics of 78 Related Airfoil Sections from Tests in the Variable-Density Wind Tunnel," NACA Technical Report 460. This data was used in designing American World War II aircraft such as the Douglas DC-3, the Boeing B-17 Flying Fortress, and the Lockheed P-38 Lightning. Additionally, the VDT served in testing thin airfoil designs and low-drag airfoils that were used to design the P-51 Mustang and reduced drag by close to two thirds.

=== National Historic Landmark Status ===
On October 3, 1985, the United States National Park Service recognized the Variable Density Tunnel as a National Historic Landmark. The nomination cited the VDT as responsible for establishing "NACA as a technically competent research organization...[rejuvenating] American aerodynamic research which in time led to the best aircraft in the world." The building in which it was originally located was demolished in 2014; the tank is now on display on the Langley grounds.

- Variable Density Tunnel
- U.S. National Register of Historic Places
- U.S. National Historic Landmark
- Virginia Landmarks Register
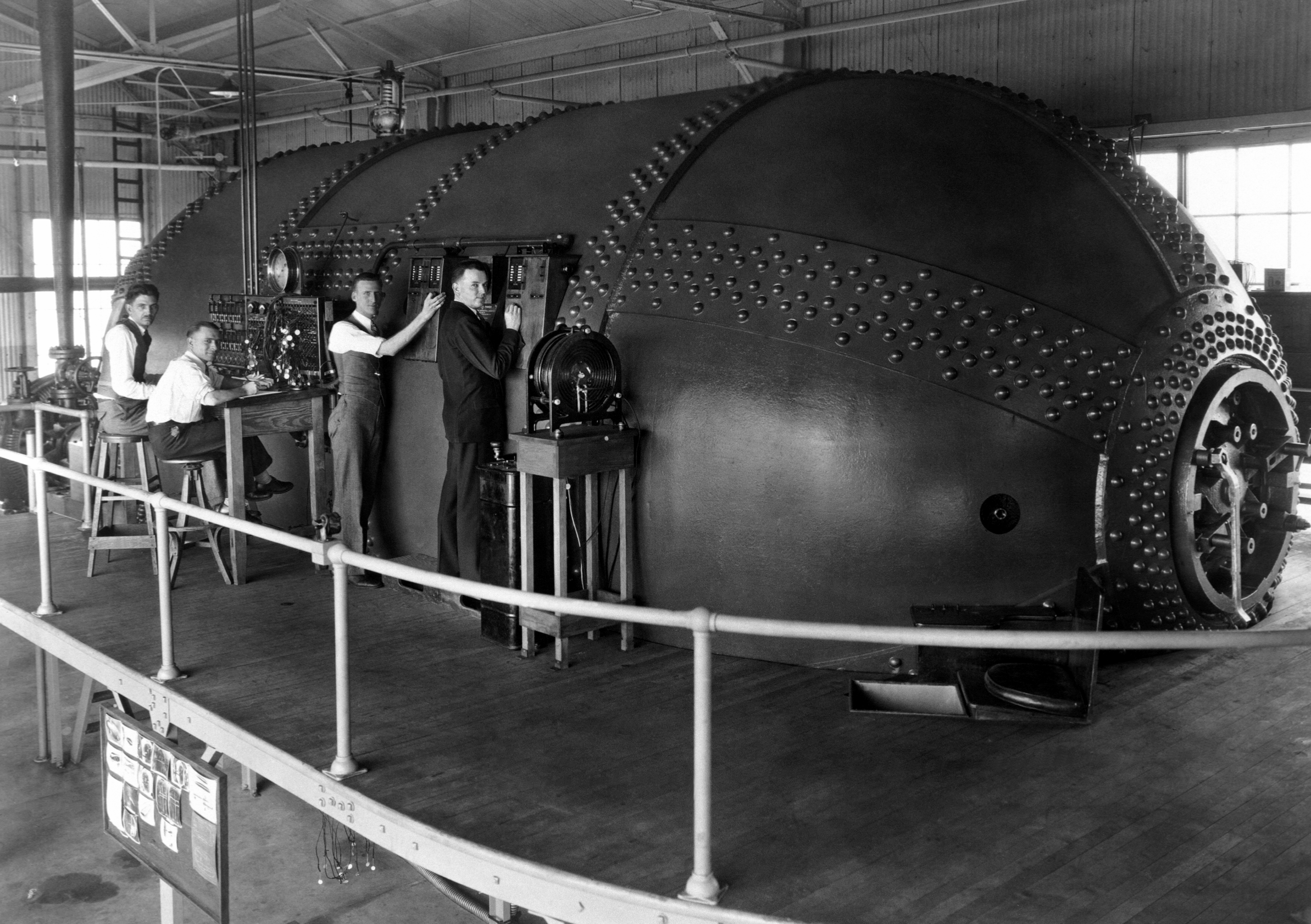
- 1929 photograph of the Variable Density Tunnel, Eastman Jacobs is at far left.
- Location: Hampton, Virginia
- Coordinates: 37°4′43″N 76°20′39″W
- Built: 1921-1923
- Architect: Max Munk
- NRHP reference No.: 85002795
- VLR No.: 114-0143

Significant dates
- Added to NRHP: October 3, 1985
- Designated NHL: October 3, 1985
- Designated VLR: February 18, 1986

== See also ==
- Wind tunnels
- Reynolds number
- Fluid dynamics
- NACA
- Langley Research Center
- Max Munk
- Eastman Jacobs
- List of National Historic Landmarks in Virginia
- National Register of Historic Places listings in Hampton, Virginia
