= Volta Congress =

Inter-war cycle of cultural meetings

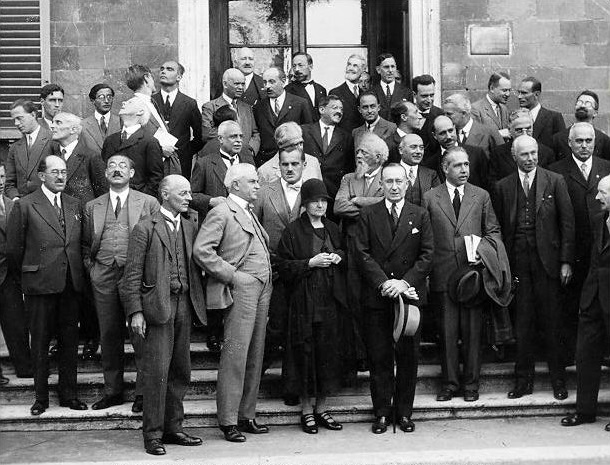
Participants of the first Volta Congress in 1931 on nuclear physics. It includes the six Nobel Prize in Physics laureates that participated at the time: Niels Bohr, Marie Curie, Enrico Fermi, Werner Heisenberg, Max von Laue, and Guglielmo Marconi.

The Volta Congress (Italian: Convegno Volta) was the name given to each of the international conferences on various topics held in Rome, Italy by the Royal Academy of Italy and funded by the Alessandro Volta Foundation. They were established in 1930 by initiative of the Società Generale Italiana Edison di Elettricità. The fifth congress in 1935 was influential in the development of aerodynamics.

These conferences took place after the Como Conference, also known as the Volta Conference, held at Lake Como in 1927 during the 100th anniversary of Alessandro Volta's death, which led to the public introduction of the principle of complementarity in quantum mechanics by Niels Bohr. The Como Conference and the interwar period Volta Congresses were funded and attended by Benito Mussolini.

== Interwar period congresses ==
During the interwar period, 8 congresses were organized by the Royal Academy of Italy, 4 under the direction of the physics branch, 2 by the history branch, 1 by the letter branch and 1 by the art branch. All travel expenses and food was covered by the organizers.

=== First Volta Congress on nuclear physics ===
The first Volta Congress was held in October 1931 on the topic of nuclear physics titled "Nuclei and Electrons". It was organized by Orso Mario Corbino and Guglielmo Marconi along with Enrico Fermi as secretary. Mussolini presided the event. It included the participation of Marie Curie, Werner Heisenberg and Niels Bohr.

=== II Volta Congress on Europe ===
In 1932, the second Volta Congress focused on the topic of "Europe". It was presided by Senator Vittorio Scialoja with the intervention of Mussolini, Marconi, Governor of Rome Francesco Boncompagni Ludovisi, and the President of the Senate Luigi Federzoni. It was notable for the participation of a number of mainly fascist theorizers and politicians. The goal of the meeting was to claim the "rebirth of European civilization could only happen following the Fascist formula." Mussolini used the conference to strengthen ties with Franz Seldte from the Der Stahlhelm and with Hermann Göring and Alfred Rosenberg from the Nazi Party.

=== III Volta Congress on immunology ===
In 1933 the third congress was on the topic of immunology. It was presided by professor of hygiene at the Royal University of Naples, Dante De Blasi.

=== IV Volta Congress on dramatic theater ===
A congress on "The Dramatic Theater" was held in 1934. It was presided by Luigi Pirandello along with Filippo Tommaso Marinetti as secretary. Notable artists like Federico García Lorca, Vsevolod Meyerhold, Eugene O'Neill, Karel Čapek and Paul Claudel were invited.

=== Vth Volta Congress on aviation ===
The influence of Italian aeronautics was gaining momentum, led by General Gaetano Arturo Crocco, an aeronautical engineer who had become interested in ramjet engines in 1931, and influenced the selection of "High Velocities in Aviation" for the 1935 Volta Congress. Consisted of 38 participants, 28 Italians, and included founders of modern aerodynamics like Ludwig Prandtl, Theodore von Kármán and G. I. Taylor. This meeting is notable historically as it introduced a number of topics in compressibility and also included the first presentation on swept wings by Adolf Busemann.

=== VI Volta Congress on figurative art ===
The 1936 Volta Congress focused on figurative art. It was presided by Marcello Piacentini. It was attended by architect Le Corbusier who gave a lecture.

=== VIII Volta Congress on nutrition ===
The 1937 Volta Congress focused on current state of knowledge on nutrition. It was presided by Filippo Bottazzi.

=== VIII Volta Congress on Africa ===
The 1938 Volta Congress' topic was "Africa". It was presided by Francesco Orestano, with the involvement of Raffaele Pettazzoni and Luigi Federzoni. It consisted of 126 invited personalities, 62 Italians, 64 foreign. It was the only congress which was partially conducted in Italian Libya.

=== Cancelled IX Volta Congress on mathematics ===
The followup IX Volta Congress on contemporary mathematics and applications in September–October 1939 was not held due to World War II. It was to be presided by Francesco Severi and Enrico Bompiani.

Before its cancellation, mathematician Tullio Levi-Civita, in a letter to Gheorghe Vrănceanu, announced that he will not participate in the congress for concerns of antisemitism. Jan Arnoldus Schouten wrote to the Royal Academy of Italy that he refused to attend as mathematicians like Levi-Civita, Guido Fubini, Beniamino Segre, David van Dantzig and Ludwig Berwald were excluded for racial discrimination.

== Later editions ==
The congresses continued in 1948:

- X Volta Congress on European history of 1848 (1948).
- XI Volta Congress on solar physics (September 1952).
- XII Volta Congress on the East and the West during the Middle Ages (May 1956).
- XIII Volta Congress on the East and the West during the Middle Ages: philosophy and science (April 1969).
