= Max Munk =

German aerospace engineer (1890–1986)

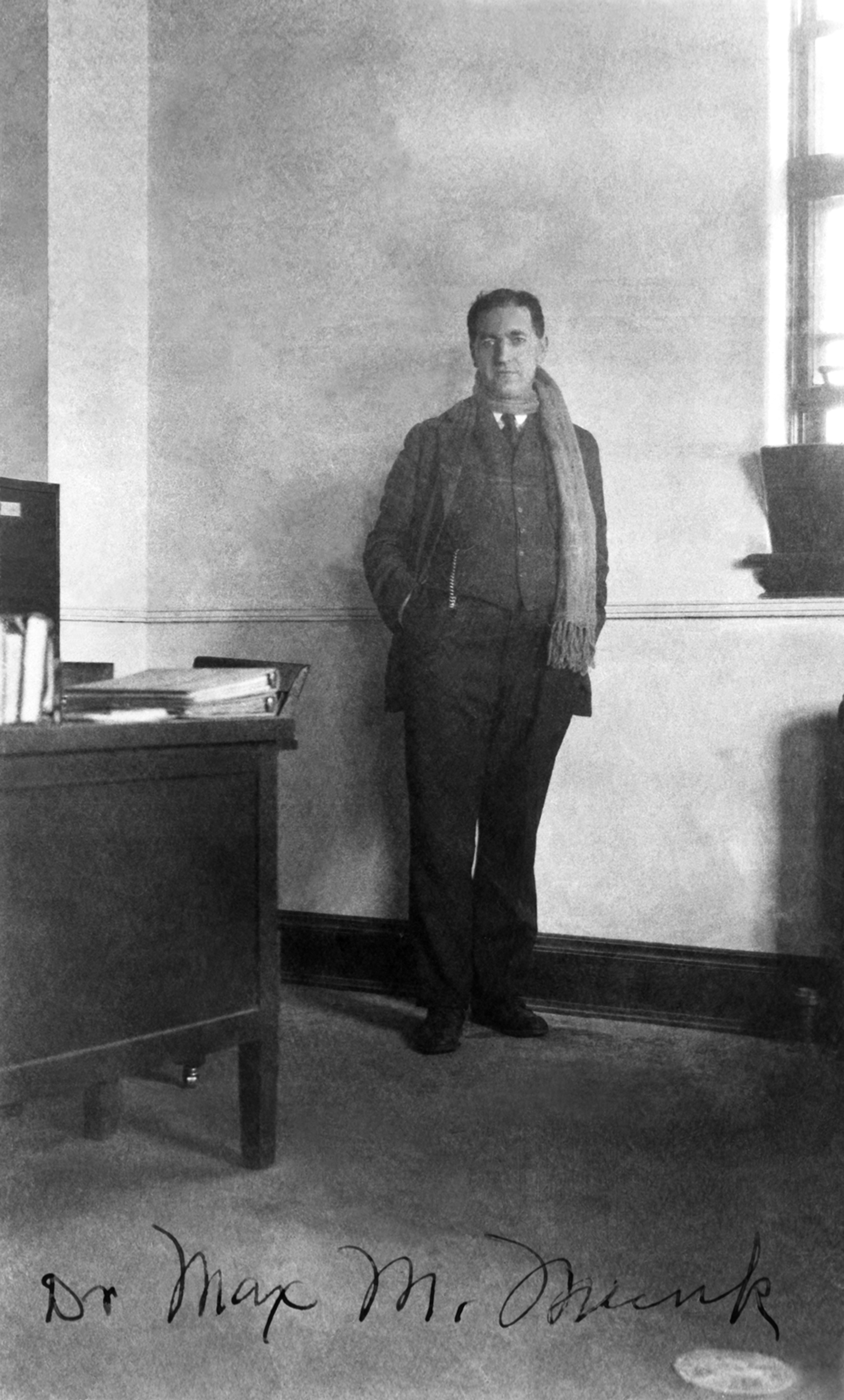
Max M. Munk, chief of aerodynamics, in his office at Langley, 1926

Max Michael Munk (October 22, 1890 – June 3, 1986) was a German aerospace engineer who worked for the National Advisory Committee for Aeronautics (NACA) in the 1920s and made contributions to the design of airfoils.

== Education and early career ==
Munk earned an engineering degree from the Hannover Polytechnic School in 1914 and doctorates in both physics and mathematics from the University of Göttingen in 1918 with a dissertation on parametric studies of airfoils under Ludwig Prandtl. Munk's dissertation contained the nucleus of what would become airfoil theory. After World War I, NACA (National Advisory Committee for Aeronautics which become NASA in 1958) brought Munk to the United States. President Woodrow Wilson signed orders allowing Munk to come to the United States and work in government. These orders were required since Germany was a recent enemy and Munk had worked briefly for the German Navy.

== Career at NACA ==
Munk began work at NACA in 1920 and proposed building the new Variable Density Tunnel (VDT) which went into operation in 1922. Munk published more than 40 articles with NACA.

=== Thin airfoil theory ===
Munk is best known for his development of thin airfoil theory, a means of modelling the behaviour of airfoils by separating their shape (the "mean camber line") and their varying thickness. This allows separate, and simpler, techniques to model each behaviour:

- Lift on an airfoil at a given angle of attack may be assumed to depend on the mean camber line, and could be modelled by the numerical techniques of the period.
- Drag depends on the thickness of the airfoil, and requires an understanding of viscous flow which was beyond contemporary capabilities.

Munk’s thin airfoil technique was introduced in 1922 and remained the major theoretical design technique until the development of laminar flow airfoils in the 1930s.

== See also ==
- Report of James and Judith Barrowman
