= Edme Mariotte =

French physicist and priest

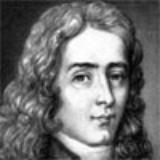
- Born: c. 1620; Til-Châtel, France
- Died: 12 May 1684 (aged 63-64); Paris, France
- Known for: Mariotte's bottle Boyle–Mariotte law Blind spot Design of the first Newton's cradle

Edme Mariotte (/ˌmɑːriˈɒt/; French: [ɛdmə maʁjɔt]; c. 1620 – 12 May 1684) was a French physicist and priest (abbé). He is particularly well known for formulating Boyle's law independently of Robert Boyle. Mariotte is also credited with designing the first Newton's cradle.

== Biography ==
Born in Til-Châtel, Edme Mariotte was the youngest son of Simon Mariotte, administrator at the district Til-Châtel (died 16 August 1652), and Catherine Denisot (died 26 September 1636 due to plague). His parents lived in Til-Châtel and had 4 other children: Jean, Denise, Claude, and Catharine. Jean was administrator in the Parlement of Paris from 1630 till his death in 1682. Denise and Claude, both married, stayed in the Dijon region, where as Catharine married Blaise de Beaubrieul, advisor of king Louis de XIV. Catherine and Blaise lived in the same street 16, perhaps on the same address, where Jean lived. The early life of Edme Mariotte is unknown. His title "Sieur de Chazeuil" was probably inherited from his brother Jean in 1682. It refers to the estate of his father, which was first given to Jean. This estate was in the region Chazeuil. It is not clear whether Mariotte spent most of his early life at Dijon, and whether he was prior of St Martin sous Beaune. There are no references to confirm this. In 1668 Colbert invited Mariotte to participate in the "l'Académie des Sciences", the French equivalence of the Royal Society. From that time on he published several articles.

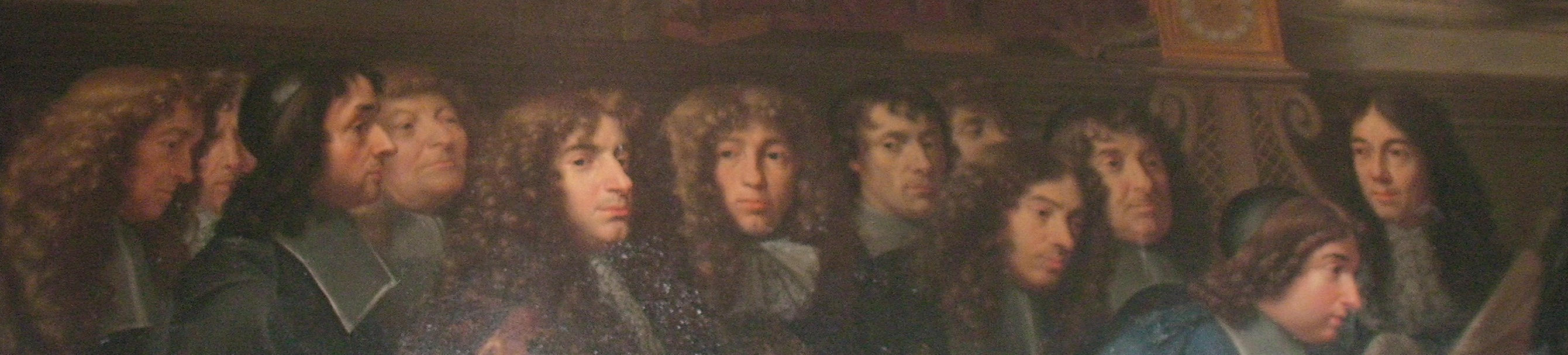
Établissement de l'Académie des sciences et foundation de l'observatoire 1666- Henri Testelin (detail). Mariotte probably 6th from right. Right of him Huygens and Cassini.

In 1670 Mariotte moved to Paris. The address on a letter found in the Leibniz archive shows that Edme lived in the rue de Bertin-Poirree, near the chapel of the guild of the goldsmiths in the rue des Orfèvres in 1677. Perhaps he lived together with Jean and the couple Catherine and Blaise de Beaubreuil. Leibniz wrote that Edme stayed at Mr. Beaubrun's address, but probably he meant Beaubreuil, which sounds quite similar. Edme died on 12 May 1684 in Paris.

== Career ==
Mariotte is best known for his recognition in 1679 of Boyle's law about the inverse relationship of volume and pressures in gases. In 1660 he had discovered the eye's blind spot. A small coin placed in the blind spot disappears from vision, a seemingly magical event that amazed the French royal court when first presented by Mariotte. He was one of the first members of the French Academy of Sciences founded at Paris in 1666.

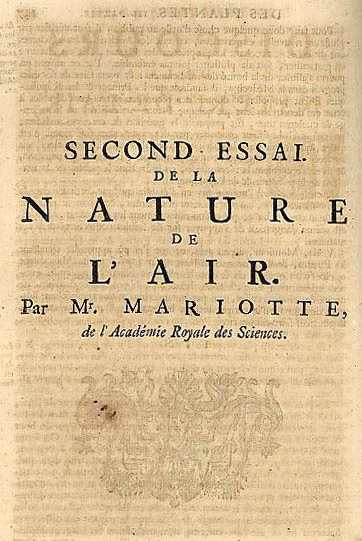
Title page of "Discours de la nature de l'air" (1676) re-edition from 1717

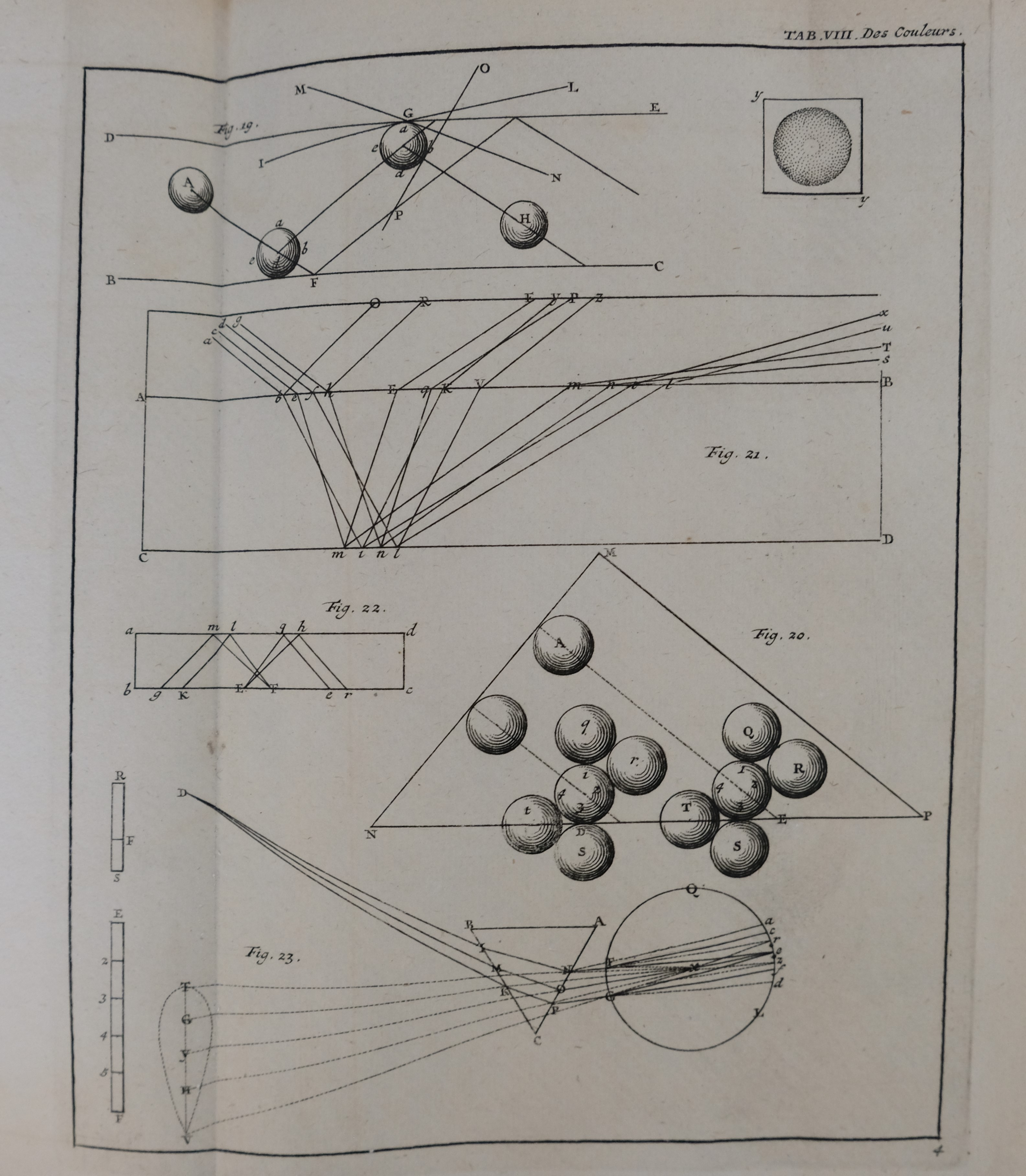
Figure in a 1717 copy of volumes I of "Œuvres de M. Mariotte

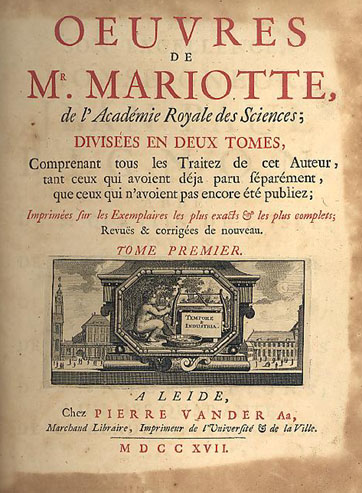
Œuvres de M. Mariotte (1717)

The first volume of the Histoire et mémoires de l'Académie (1733) contains many original papers by him upon a great variety of physical subjects, such as the motion of fluids, the nature of colour, the notes of the trumpet, the barometer, the fall of bodies, the recoil of guns, the freezing of water, the absorption of heat rays by glass etc. His Essais de physique, four in number, of which the first three were published at Paris between 1676 and 1679, are his most important works, and form, together with a Traité de la percussion des corps, the first volume of the Œuvres de Mariotte (2 vols., Leiden, 1717).

The second of these essays (De la nature de l'air) contains the statement of the law that the volume of a gas varies inversely as the pressure. It was made from the discovery by Robert Boyle in 1662; Mariotte said Boyle's theory was right only when the temperature is constant. However, outside France it is best known as Boyle's law.

The fourth essay is a systematic treatment of the nature of colour, with a description of many curious experiments and a discussion of the rainbow, halos, parhelia, diffraction, and the more purely physiological phenomena of colour. He also made a significant contribution to the development of aerodynamic theory with the statement that aerodynamic resistance varies as the square of the velocity. The discovery of the blind spot is noted in a short paper in the second volume of his collected works.

Newton's cradle

=== Newton's cradle ===
Mariotte invented what is today known as Newton's cradle to demonstrate Newton's first law and the collision of suspended bodies of equal mass with the motion of the moving body being transferred to the one at rest. Newton acknowledged Mariotte's work, among that of others, in his Principia.

== Publications ==
- Nouvelle découverte touchant la veüe (1668)
- Traité du nivellement, avec la description de quelques niveaux nouvellement inventez (1672)
- Traité de la percussion ou choc des corps, dans lequel les principales règles du mouvement, contraires à celles que Mr. Descartes et quelques autres modernes ont voulu établir, sont démontrées par leurs véritables causes (1673)
- Lettres écrites par MM. Mariotte, Pecquet, et Perrault, sur le sujet d'une nouvelle découverte touchant la veüe faite par M. Mariotte (1676)
- Essay de logique, contenant les principes des sciences et la manière de s'en servir pour faire de bons raisonnemens (1678). Texte en ligne Réédition sous le titre : Essai de logique. Suivi de : Les principes du devoir et des connaissances humaines, Fayard, Paris, 1992.
- Essais de physique, ou Mémoires pour servir à la science des choses naturelles attribué à Roberval (1679–1681)

Posthumous publications

- Traité du mouvement des eaux et des autres corps fluides, divisé en V parties, par feu M. Mariotte, mis en lumière par les soins de M. de La Hire (1686). This was translated into English by John Theophilus Desaguliers in 1718
- Œuvres de Mariotte (2 volumes, 1717). Réédition : J. Peyroux, Bordeaux, 2001. Texte en ligne
- [Opere] (in French). Den Haag: Jean Neaulme. 1740.
- Discours de la nature de l'air, de la végétation des plantes. Nouvelle découverte touchant la vue, Gauthier-Villars, Paris, 1923.

== See also ==
- Elastic and inelastic collisions apparatus
- History of fluid mechanics
- Studies of air resistance
- List of Catholic clergy scientists
