= Angioscotoma =

Area of reduced or absent vision corresponding to retinal blood vessels

An angioscotoma is a localized area of lower or absent visual sensitivity that follows the course of a retinal blood vessel. Because light‑sensitive photoreceptors lying beneath the retinal blood vessels receive less illumination, they send reduced or absent signals to the brain, creating blind regions that normally go unnoticed, since retinal adaptation suppresses awareness of this, similar to how the central blind spot is invisible. Angioscotomas are best revealed with specialized forms of perimetry and psychophysical testing. The magnitude of the defect depends on vessel calibre, eccentricity, and stimulus parameters. It has been shown in squirrel monkeys that angioscotoma casts a "shadow" on the retinotopic map of the visual field in the visual cortex.

== History ==
The blind spot was discovered by Edme Mariotte in the 17th century, as a scotoma of the optic disc. It was understood and measured as a roughly elliptic region. Helmholtz in the 19th century noted in his Treatise on Physiological Optics that there are some stump-like extensions to the blind spot. However, they did not notice the scotoma due to retinal blood vessels.

Angioscotomas were first discovered and mapped out by John Norris Evans (February 28, 1891 – April 8, 1953) in 1926, who coined the term angioscotometry to describe the painstaking charting of the scotoma of the retinal blood vessels by manual perimetry. He seated each subject in a seat in a dark setting, and tested whether they could see a tiny bright test object placed at various locations. Using a 1.5 mm white disk, Evans reported intricate branch‑like scotomas that mirrored the arteries and veins emerging from the optic disc, with a full map requiring up to 2 hours to complete. He plotted this for subjects under various conditions, such as while holding breath, with glaucoma, etc. A year later, he confirmed that only short stump‑like scotomas had been noticed previously, some further data plotted with a smaller 1 mm stimuli, and under varying conditions on the subject. He published a monograph on this in 1938 in which he described its use in assisting diagnosis of various conditions, such as retinal edema, glaucoma, optic neuritis, etc.

In the 1940s there were further developments. Evans reviewed the state of research in 1942. In 1945, Welt designed a portable campimeter and linked the size of both the blind spot and the angioscotoma to retinal arterial pressure. In the same year, Weekers and Humblet published detailed tracings that overlaid vessel photographs onto Bjerrum screen plots, firmly establishing the one‑to‑one correspondence between vascular anatomy and scotoma shape.

With the advent of computer-automated perimetry in the 1970s, angioscotomas could be plotted with higher precision. More recently, microperimetry by adaptive optics scanning laser ophthalmoscopy (AOSLO) has been applied to angioscotometry, and it was revealed that the average cone sensitivity can drop by 3–5 dB directly over a parafoveal vessel only 21 μm wide, corresponding to 4.2′ in angle.

== Cortical map ==
Angioscotomas have an effect beyond the retina, affecting the retinotopic map on the visual cortex. In squirrel monkeys, focal deprivation by vascular shadows causes a precise rerouting of geniculocortical afferents in layer 4C of primary visual cortex, producing dark, vessel‑shaped columns after enucleation of one of the eyes. Where ocular dominance columns are fine, each angioscotoma is flanked by pale zones mapped exclusively to the opposite eye, implying a reciprocal exchange of cortical territory during development. In macaques and humans, whose ocular dominance columns are broader relative to vessel size, such representations had not been detected visible, suggesting species differences in competitive plasticity.

== Gallery ==
Angioscotomas plotted from normal subjects
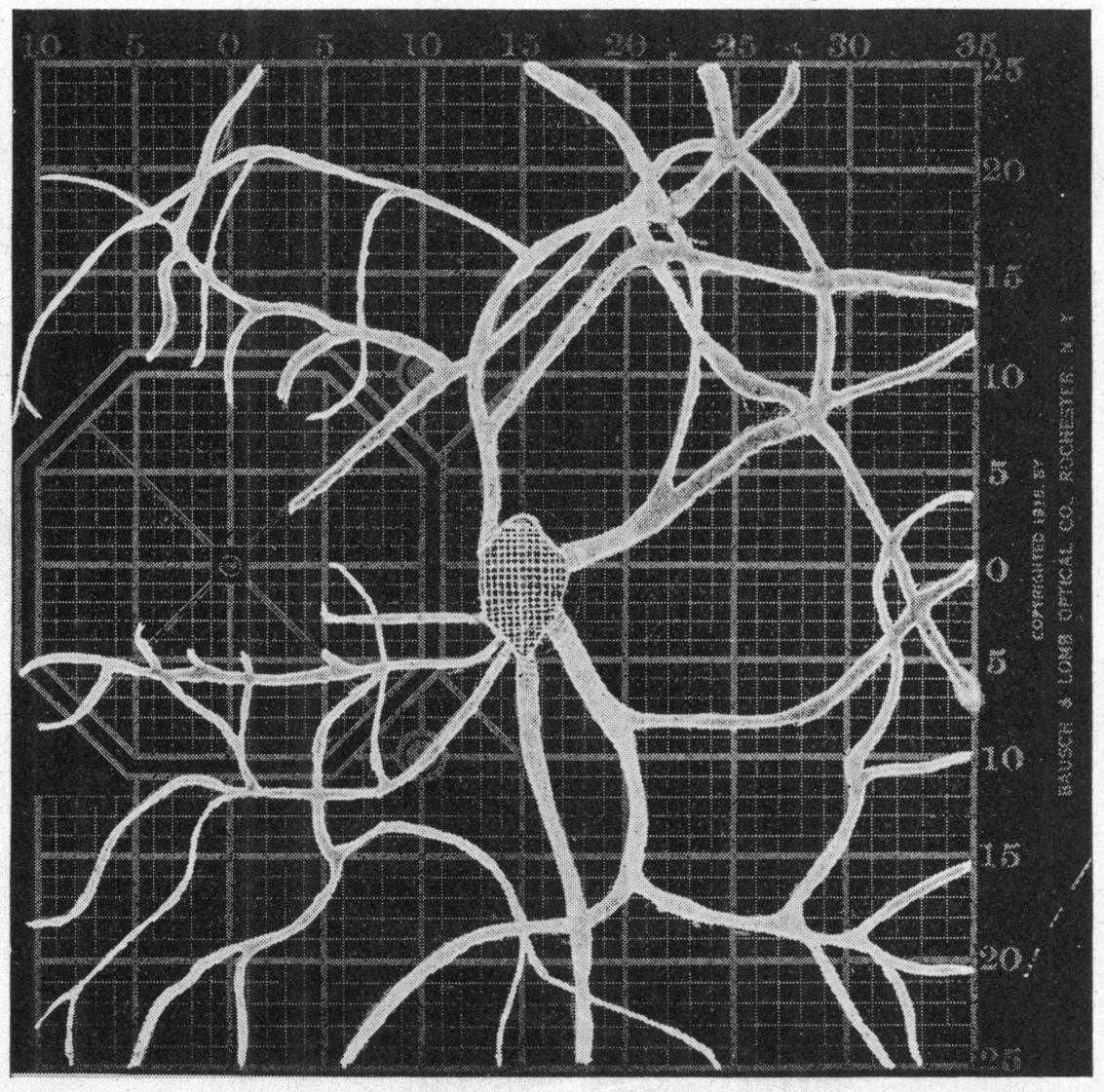

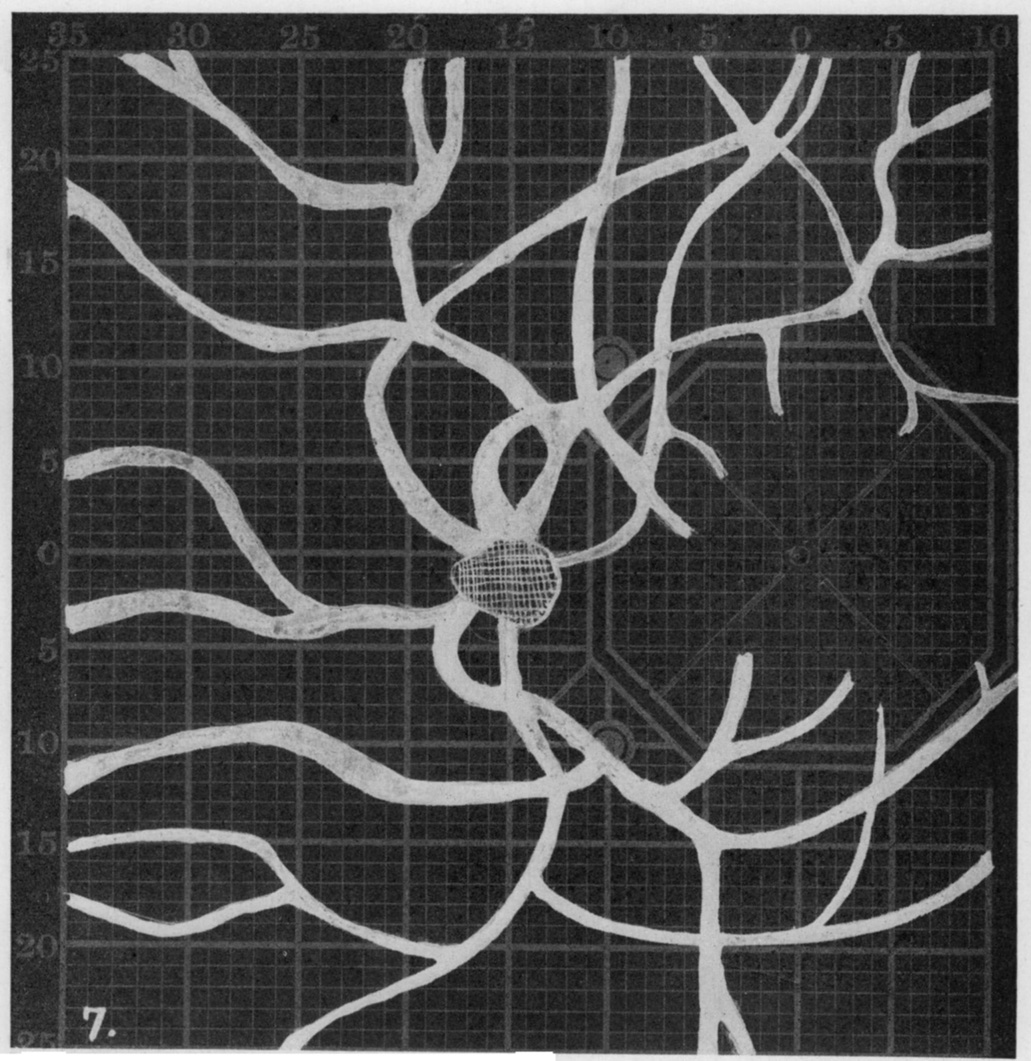

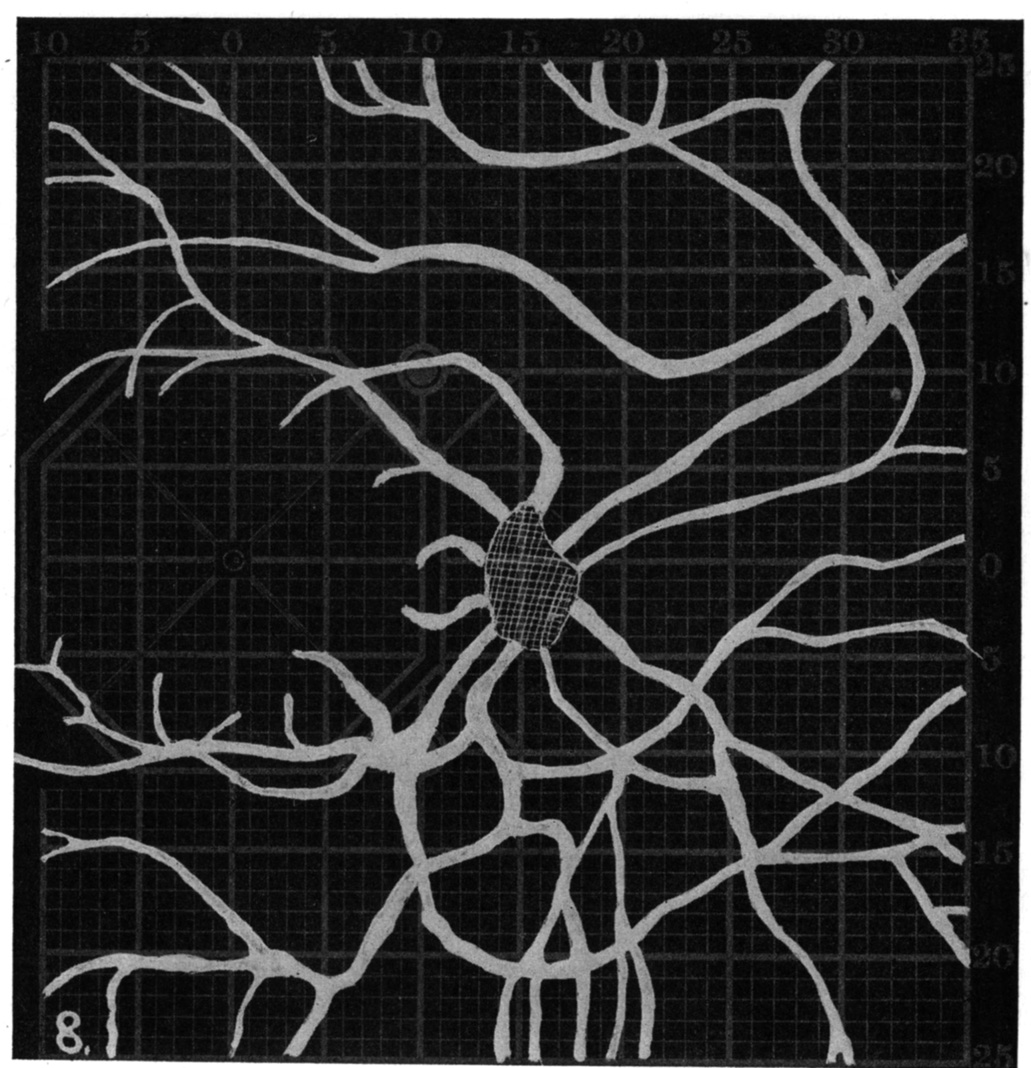

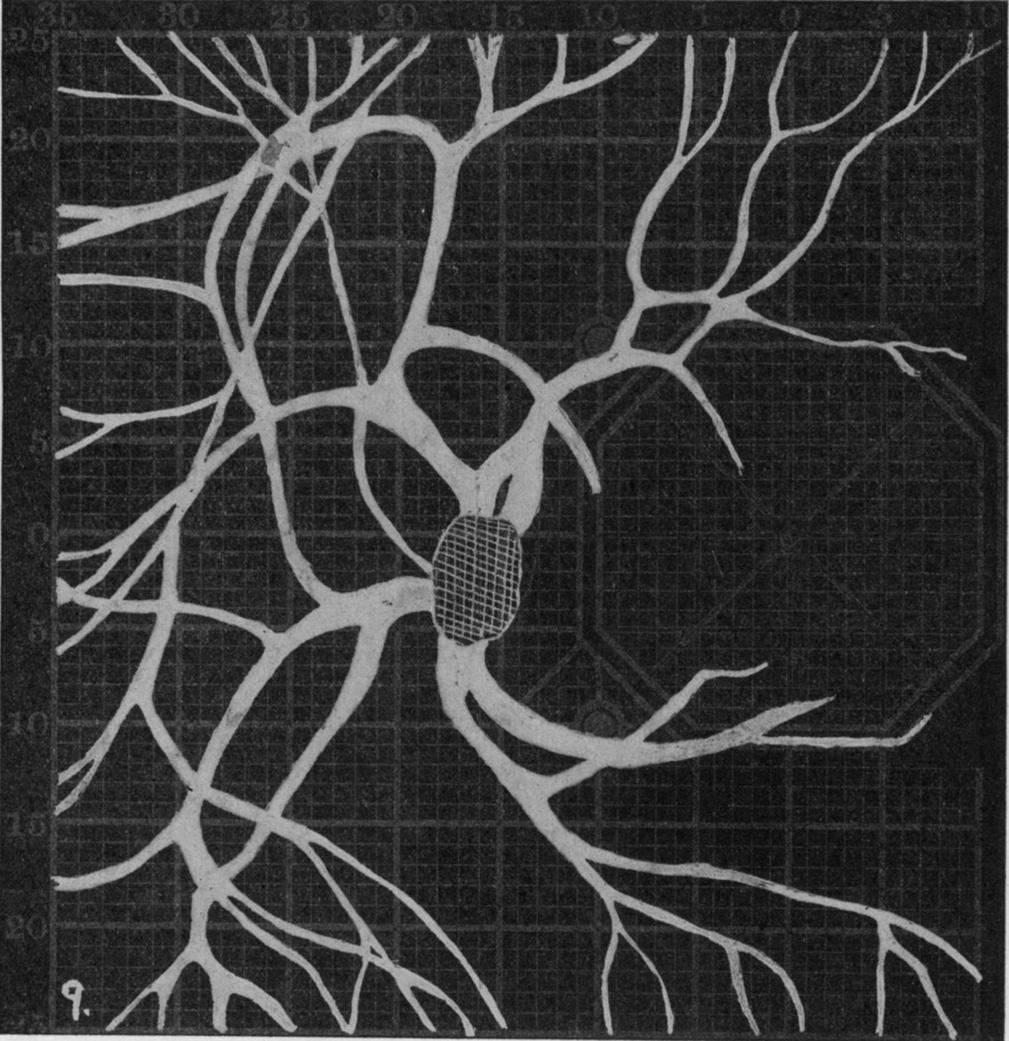
Angioscotomas plotted under special conditions
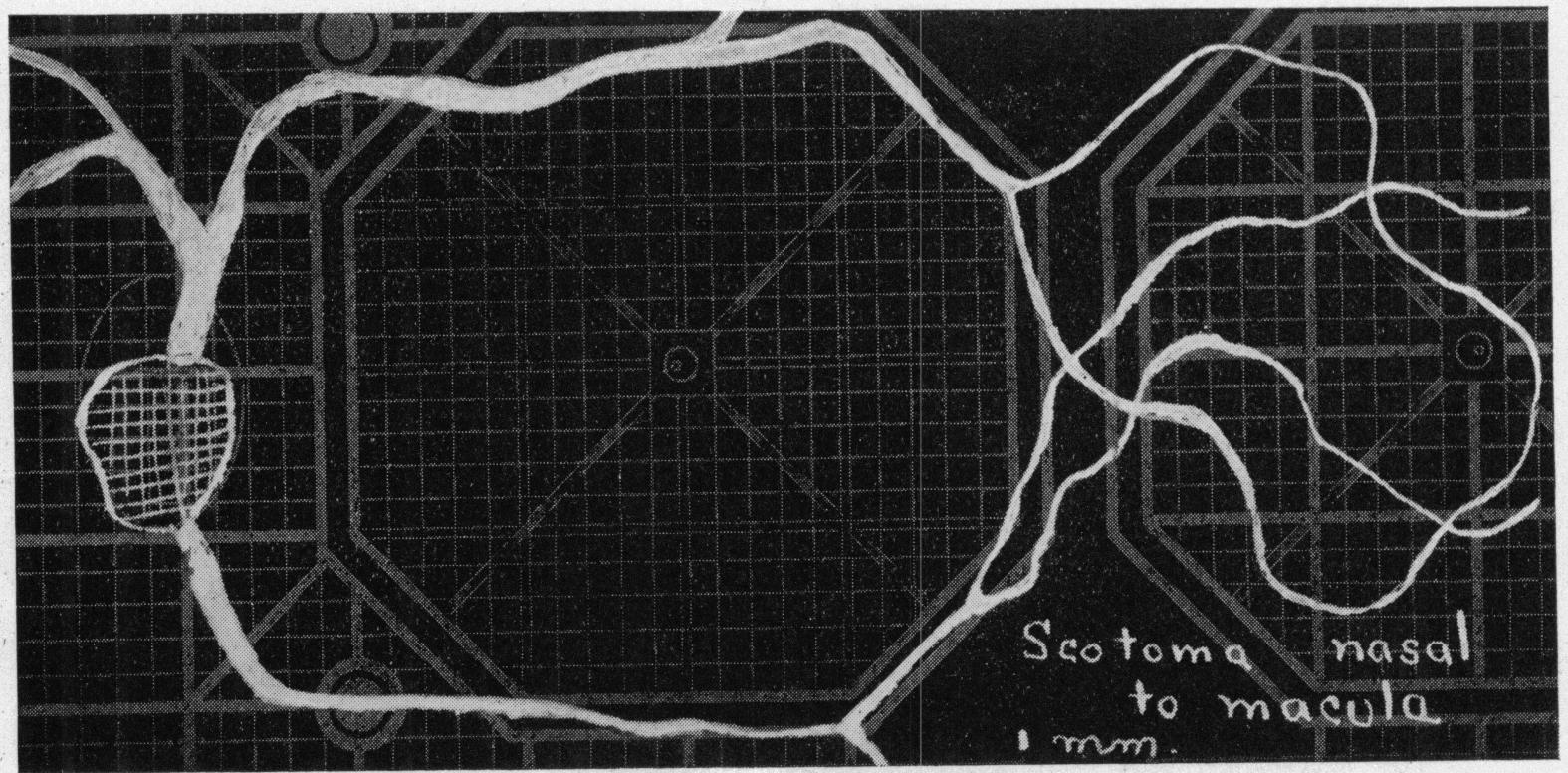
Using eccentric fixation, the more nasal parts of the angioscotoma can be plotted.

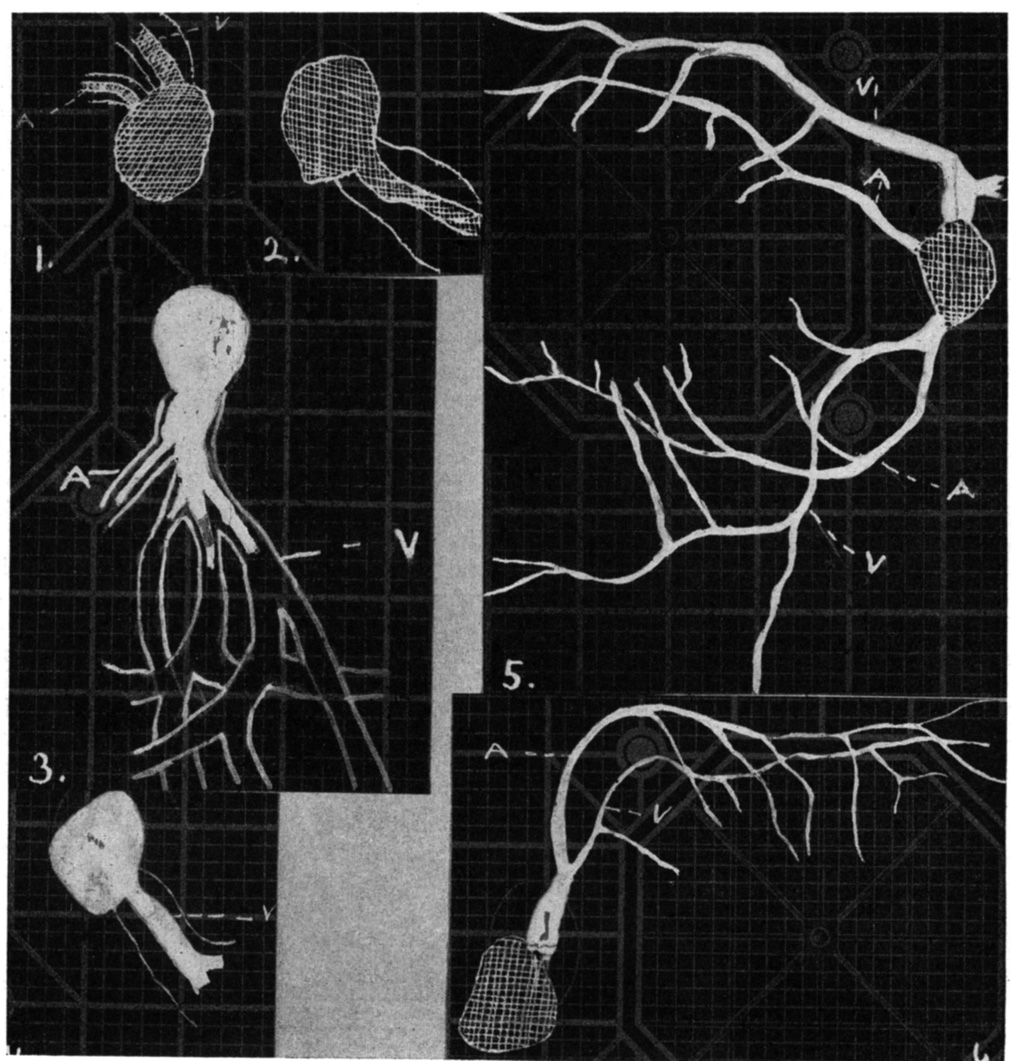
1. Pressure on globe shows only stumps of large vessels. 2. Holding the breath causes similar effect; also 3. Holding the head low. 4. Pressure on opposite eye widens arteries and still more veins, 5. Pressure on the carotid produces no definite effect. 6. Looking thru red glass brings out finer vessels.

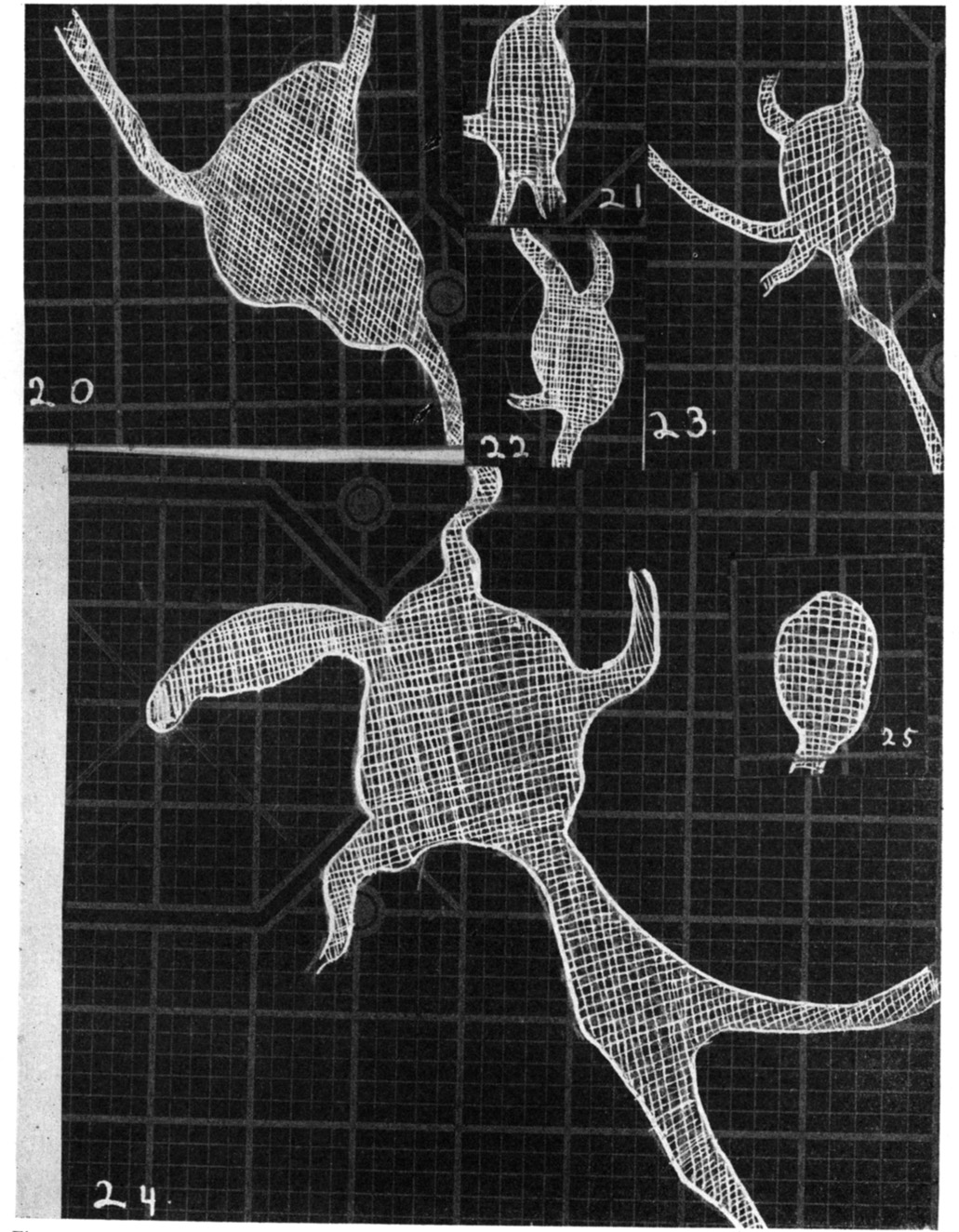
20. Venous engorgement. 21. After pressure over internal 22. Same case, normal. 23. Scotoma after ligation of common carotid. 24. Edematous swelling of nerve and retina. 25, Normal blind spot of other eye.

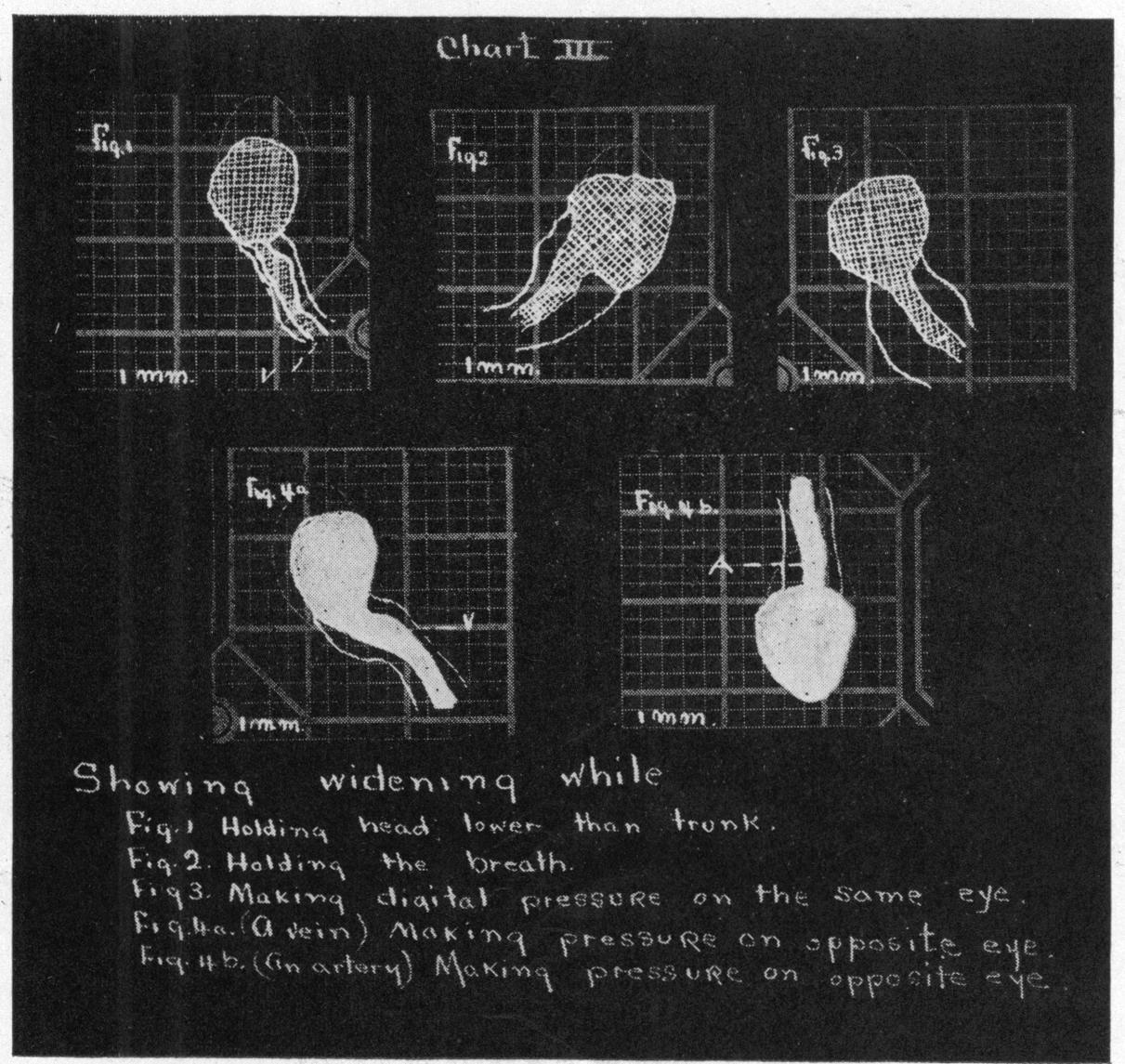
Widening of angioscotoma under various conditions (holding head lower than trunk; holding the breath; making digital pressure on the same eye; (a vein) on opposite eye; (an artery) on opposite eye).

== See also ==
- Blind spot
- Ocular dominance column
- Perimetry
- Purkinje tree
