= Acute idiopathic blind spot enlargement syndrome =

Eye disease affecting the retina

- Other names: AIBSE syndrome
- Specialty: Ophthalmology
- Diagnostic method: Eye examination, Visual field test
- Treatment: Nil, Usually self limiting

Acute idiopathic blind spot enlargement syndrome (AIBSE) is a rare eye disease affecting the retina of the eye. It is basically a type of retinopathy which affects females more than males. Currently there is no treatment for this condition, but, it is usually self limiting.

== Signs and Symptoms ==
Enlargement of blind spot area in the visual field of the eye is the main sign and acute onset photopsia is the main symptom of AIBSE syndrome. Other symptoms include monocular scotoma and reduced light perception.

== Cause ==
Though exact etiology of AIBSE syndrome is unknown, studies shows that viral illness like influenza and vaccinations like MMR may trigger the condition.

== Diagnosis ==
Diagnostic techniques like ophthalmoscopy, visual field test, optical coherence tomography, fluorescein angiography, multifocal electroretinography and electrophysiology may be used in diagnosing AIBSE syndrome. Subjective measurement of blind spot enlargement is done using visual field testing. In the early stages, using FFA peripapillary hyperfluorescence may be observed. Since OCT can be used to observe the microstructural alterations in the outer retina, it is the gold standard in diagnosing AIBSES.

== Treatment ==
Currently there is no treatment for this condition, but, it is usually self limiting. Systemic administration of corticosteroids may be advised. Even if the disease is resolved, the enlarged blind spot usually does not return to normal.

== Epidemiology ==
AIBSE syndrome affects females more than males. Higher incidence is seen in Caucasian people.

== History ==
Fletcher et al. first described AIBSE syndrome in 1988.
