= Blind spot (vision) =

Blindpoint of human eye

In vertebrate eyes, the nerve fibers route before the retina, blocking some light and creating a blind spot where the fibers pass through the retina and out of the eye. In octopus eyes, the nerve fibers route behind the retina, and do not block light or disrupt the retina. In the example, 4 denotes the vertebrate blind spot, which is notably absent in the octopus eye. In both images, 1 denotes the retina and 2 the nerve fibers, including the optic nerve (3).

Distribution of rods and cones along a line passing through the fovea and the blind spot of a human eye

A blind spot, scotoma, is an obscuration of the visual field. A particular blind spot known as the physiological blind spot, "blind point", or punctum caecum in medical literature, is the place in the visual field that corresponds to the lack of light-detecting photoreceptor cells on the optic disc of the retina where the optic nerve passes through the optic disc. Because there are no cells to detect light on the optic disc, the corresponding part of the field of vision is invisible. Via processes in the brain, the blind spot is interpolated based on surrounding detail and information from the other eye, so it is not normally perceived.

Although all vertebrates have this blind spot, cephalopod eyes, which are only superficially similar because they evolved independently, do not. In them, the optic nerve approaches the receptors from behind, so it does not create a break in the retina.

The first documented observation of the phenomenon was in the 1660s by Edme Mariotte in France. At the time it was generally thought that the point at which the optic nerve entered the eye should actually be the most sensitive portion of the retina; however, Mariotte's discovery disproved this theory.

The blind spot in humans is located about 12–15° temporally and 1.5° below the horizontal and is roughly 7.5° high and 5.5° wide. Though harder to detect, the blind spot extends over the entire retina as angioscotoma.

== History ==
The blind spot was first discovered by the French scientist Edme Mariotte in the 17th century (around 1668). He was experimenting with vision and noticed that there was a point in the visual field where no image was perceived. This contradicted the earlier assumption that the entire retina was capable of detecting light. He presented this finding in the court of King Louis XIV of France and also to the Royal Society of London, sparking further interest among scientists and philosophers.

== Blind spot test ==
Demonstration of the blind spot
R	L
Instructions: Close one eye and focus the other on the appropriate letter (R for right or L for left). Place your eye a distance from the screen approximately equal to three times the distance between the R and the L. Move your eye towards or away from the screen until you notice the other letter disappear. For example, close your right eye, look at the "L" with your left eye, and the "R" will disappear.

== Night blind spot ==
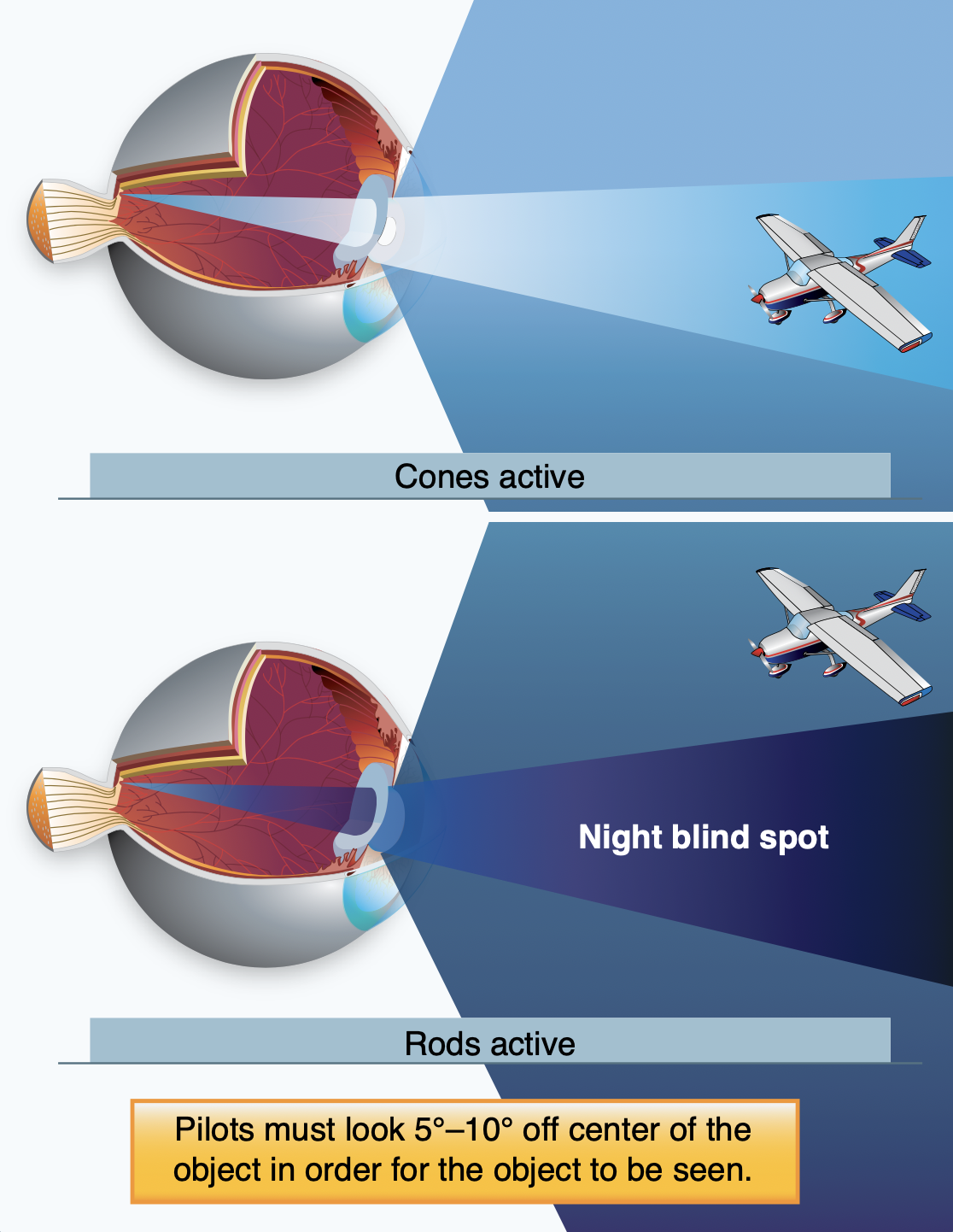
Night blind spot

It is estimated that once fully adapted to darkness, the rods are 10,000 times more sensitive to light than the cones, making them the primary receptors for night vision. Since the cones are concentrated near the fovea, the rods are also responsible for much of the peripheral vision. The concentration of cones in the fovea can make a night blind spot in the center of the field of vision for very dim objects.

== See also ==
- Bias blind spot
- Filling-in
- Horizontal eccentricity
- Acute idiopathic blind spot enlargement syndrome
- Angioscotoma
