= Elastic and inelastic collisions apparatus =

18th-century experimental apparatus demonstrating elastic and inelastic collisions

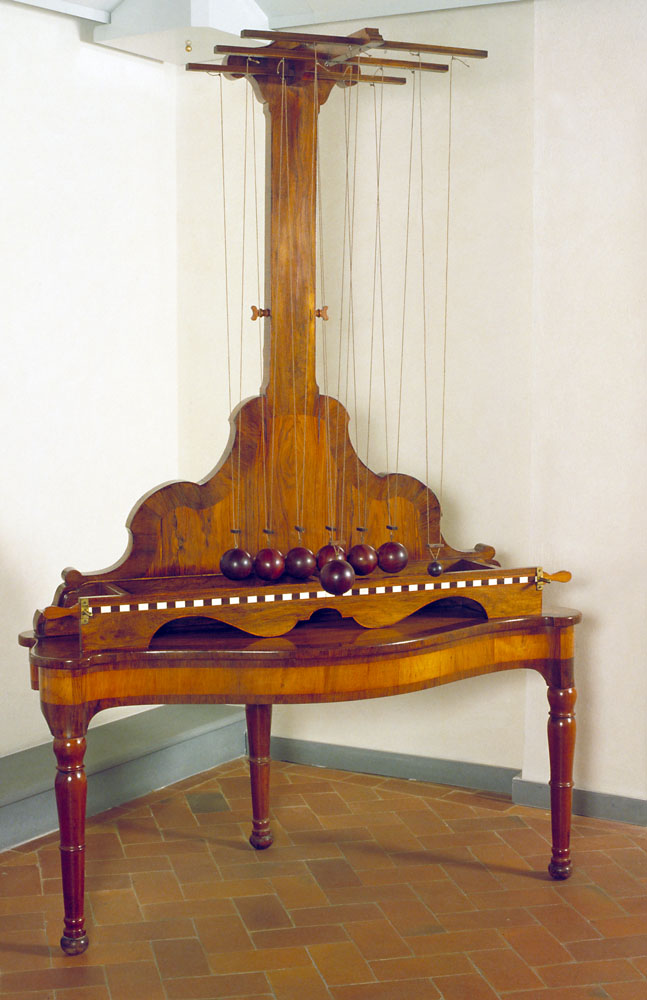
Elastic and inelastic collisions apparatus

The elastic and inelastic collisions apparatus is a large apparatus to study elastic and inelastic collisions.

It consists of a large frame carrying two beams from which two rows of six and two wooden balls, respectively, are suspended from pairs of strings. The instrument was often used with two elastic balls (of ivory) or inelastic balls (of wet clay), of equal or different mass. By changing the parameters of the experiments such as height of fall and mass, one could conduct a systematic investigation of collision-related phenomena. For example, when the row of balls is struck by one of the outermost balls, the row of balls remains motionless and the impulse is fully transmitted to the ball at the opposite end, which rebounds. As it falls back, the cycle continues in the opposite direction. This apparatus was illustrated by Jean-Antoine Nollet in Leçons de physique expérimentale (Paris, 1743–1748). In his description, Nollet claims to have merely altered and developed a model previously used by Edme Mariotte. The most sophisticated devices for studying elastic and inelastic collisions were built by Willem Jacob 's Gravesande and Petrus van Musschenbroek.

The instrument is held in the Lorraine collections of the Museo Galileo in Florence.

== Bibliography ==
- Istituto e Museo di storia della scienza (Firenze) (1991). Mara Miniati (ed.). Museo di storia della scienza: catalogo. Giunti. p. 294, board n. 17. ISBN 88-09-20036-5.
- Istituto e Museo di storia della scienza (Firenze) (1993). Paolo Brenni (ed.). Catalogue of mechanical instruments. Giunti. ISBN 88-09-20732-7.
