= Cephalopod eye =

Visual sensory organs of cephalopod molluscs

In vertebrate eyes, the nerve fibers route before the retina, blocking some light and creating a blind spot where the fibers pass through the retina. In cephalopod eyes, the nerve fibers route behind the retina, and do not block light or disrupt the retina. 1 is the retina and 2 the nerve fibers. 3 is the optic nerve. 4 is the vertebrate blind spot.

Cephalopods, as active marine predators, possess sensory organs specialized for use in aquatic conditions. They have a camera-type eye which consists of an iris, a circular lens, vitreous cavity (eye gel), pigment cells, and photoreceptor cells that translate light from the light-sensitive retina into nerve signals which travel along the optic nerve to the brain. For the past 140 years, the camera-type cephalopod eye has been compared with the vertebrate eye as an example of convergent evolution, where both types of organisms have independently evolved the camera-eye trait and both share similar functionality. Contention exists on whether this is truly convergent evolution or parallel evolution. Unlike the vertebrate camera eye, the cephalopods' form as invaginations of the body surface (rather than outgrowths of the brain), and consequently the cornea lies over the top of the eye as opposed to being a structural part of the eye. Unlike the vertebrate eye, a cephalopod eye is focused through movement, much like the lens of a camera or telescope, rather than changing shape as the lens in the human eye does. The eye is approximately spherical, as is the lens, which is fully internal.

Cephalopods' eyes develop in such a way that they have retinal axons that pass over the back of the retina, so the optic nerve does not have to pass through the photoreceptor layer to exit the eye and do not have the natural physiological blind spot of vertebrates.

The crystallins used in the lens appear to have developed independently from vertebrate crystallins, suggesting a homoplasious origin of the lens.

Most cephalopods possess complex extraocular muscle systems that allow for very fine control over the gross positioning of the eyes. Octopuses possess an autonomic response that maintains the orientation of their pupils such that they are always horizontal.

== Polarized light ==
Several types of cephalopods, most notably squid and octopuses, and potentially cuttlefish, have eyes that can distinguish the orientation of polarized light. This sensitivity is due to the orthogonal organization of neighboring photoreceptors. (Cephalopods have receptor cells called rhabdoms similar to those of other molluscs.) In contrast, the vertebrate eye is normally insensitive to polarization differences because the opsins in rods and cones are arrayed semi-randomly. And thus, the eye is equally sensitive to any orientation of the e-vector axis of the light. Because of their orthogonal organization, the opsins in cephalopod eyes have the highest light absorption when aligned properly with the light e-vector axis, allowing sensitivity to differences in polarization. The precise function of this ability has not been proven, but it is hypothesized to be for prey detection, navigation, and possibly communication among the color-changing cephalopods.

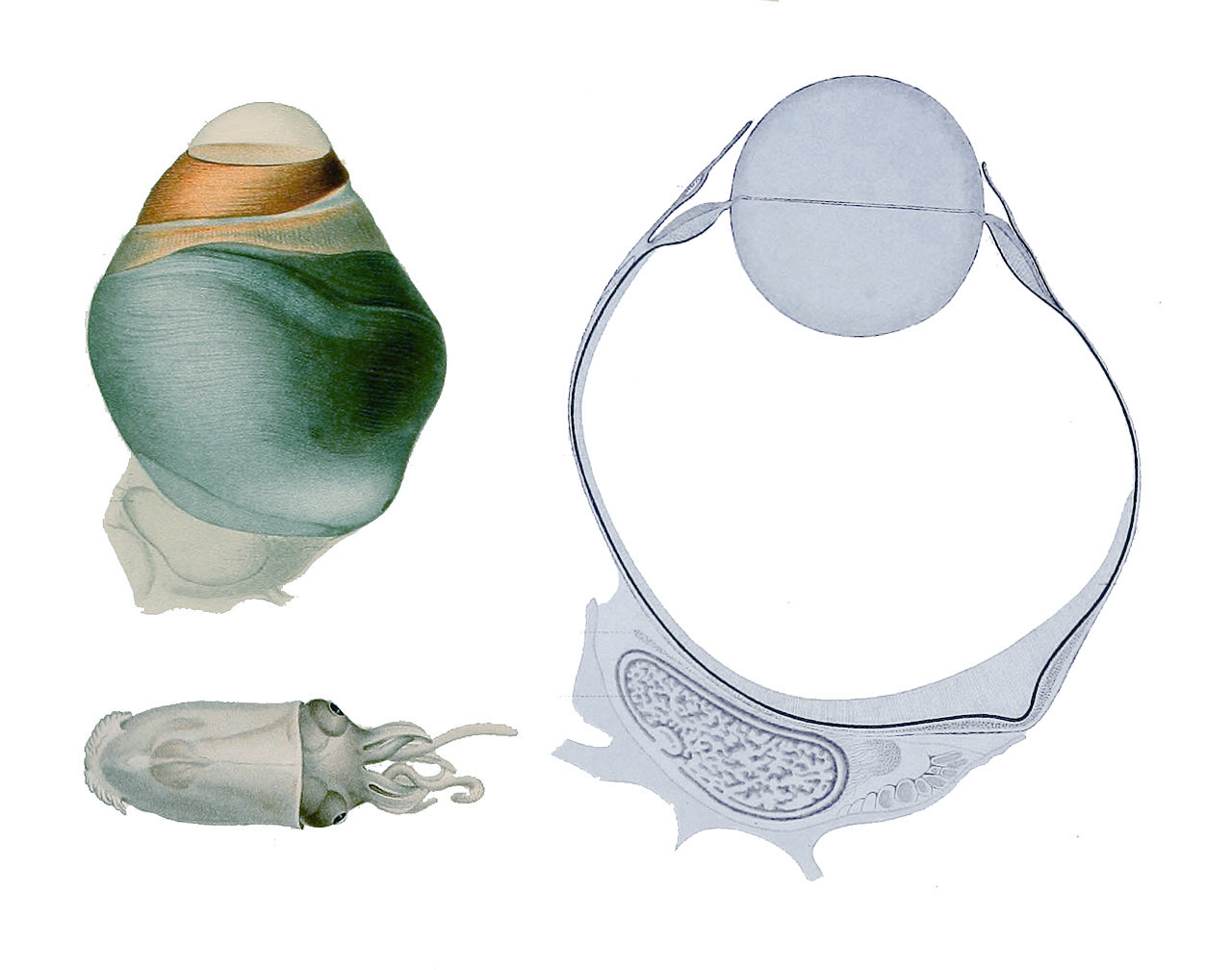
Eye of Bathyteuthis sp.

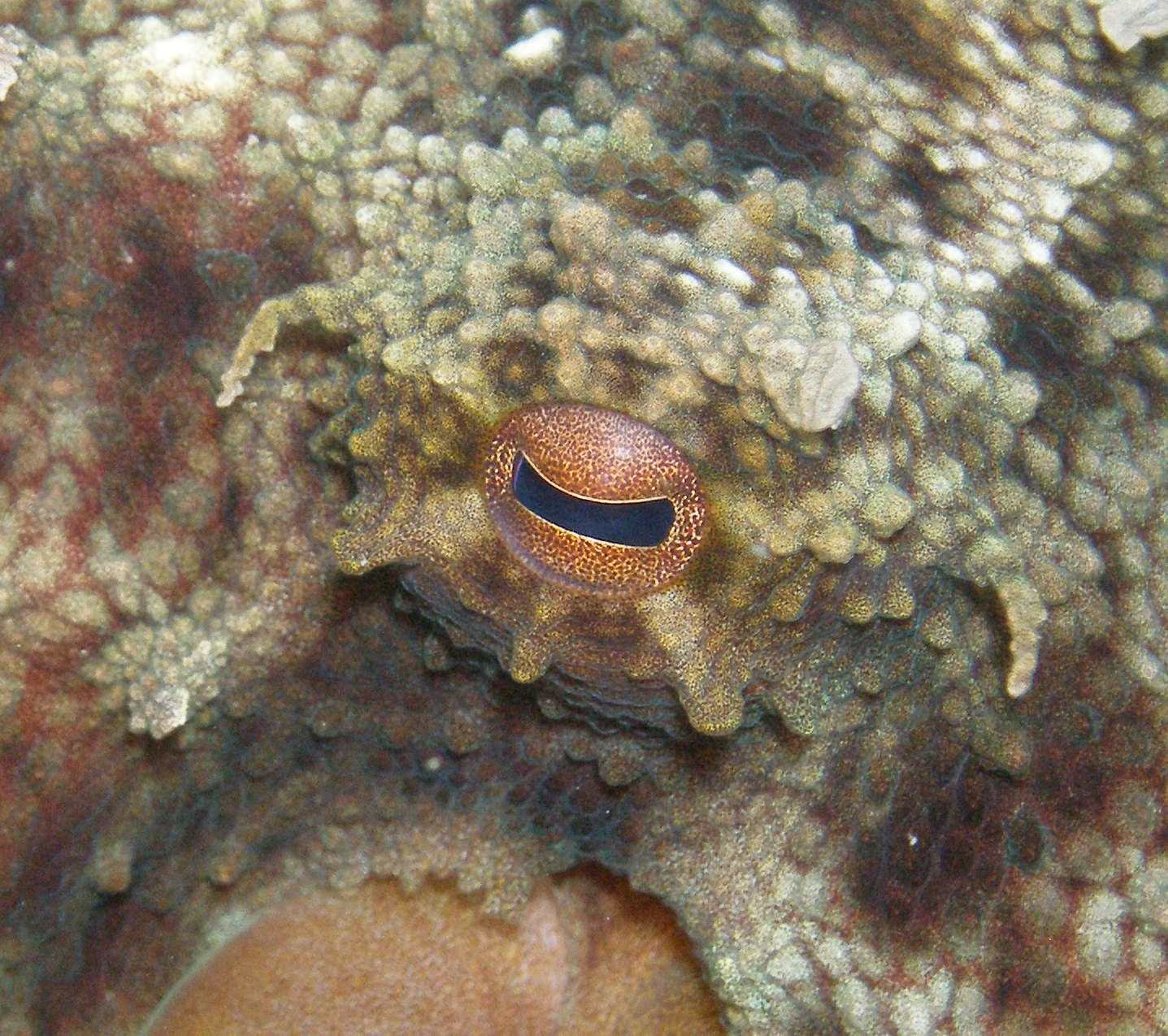
Octopus (Octopus vulgaris) eye

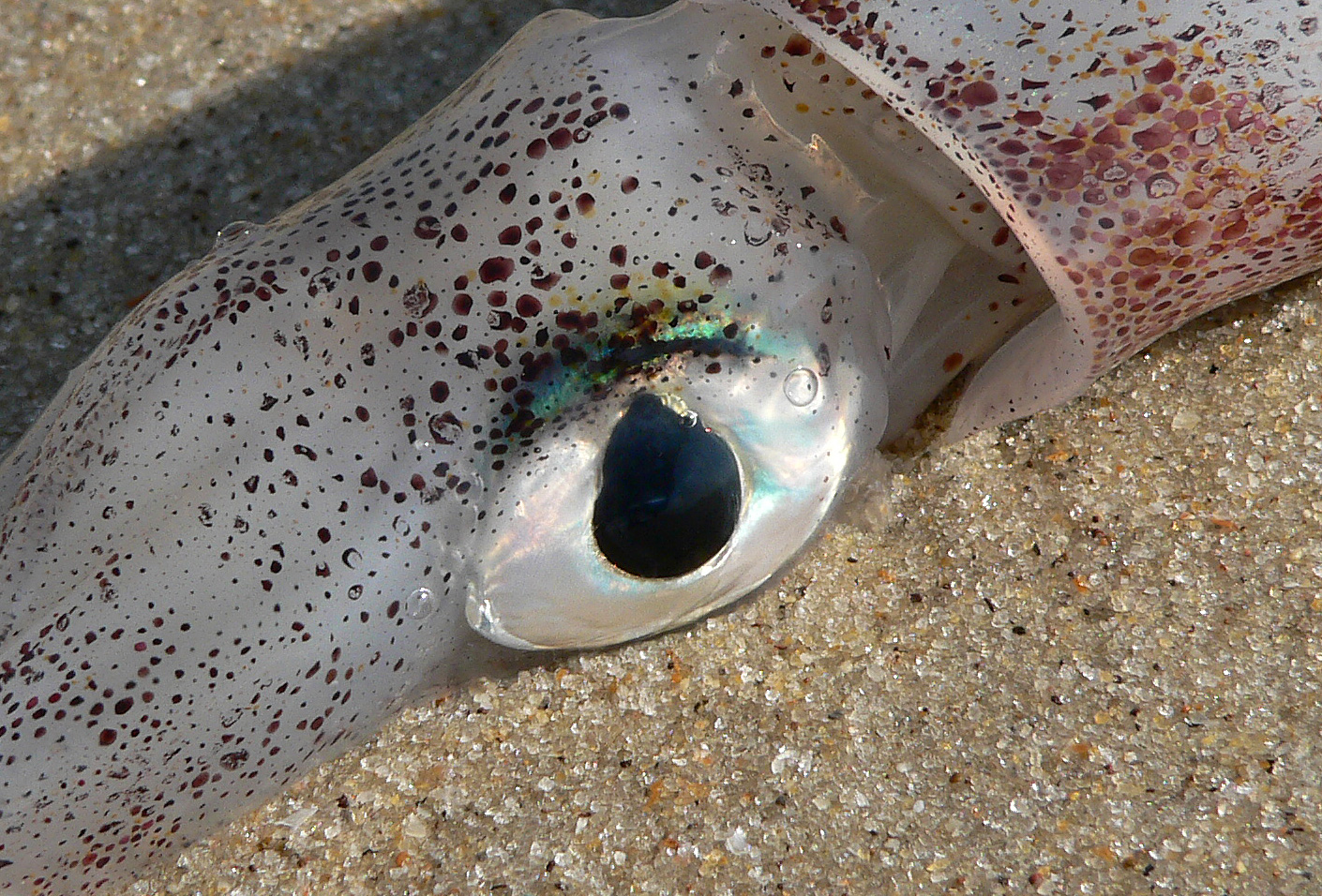
Squid eye

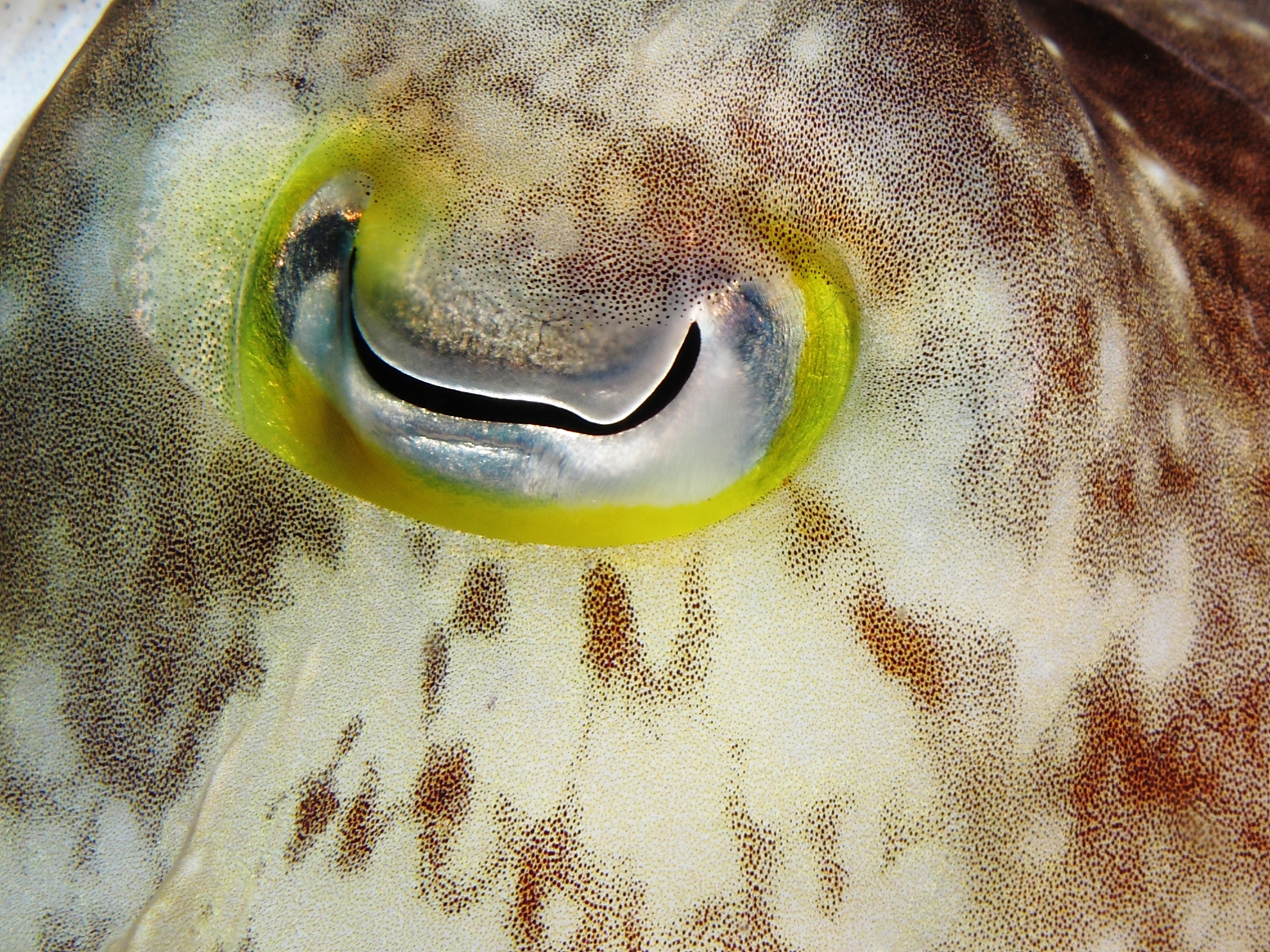
Cuttlefish eye

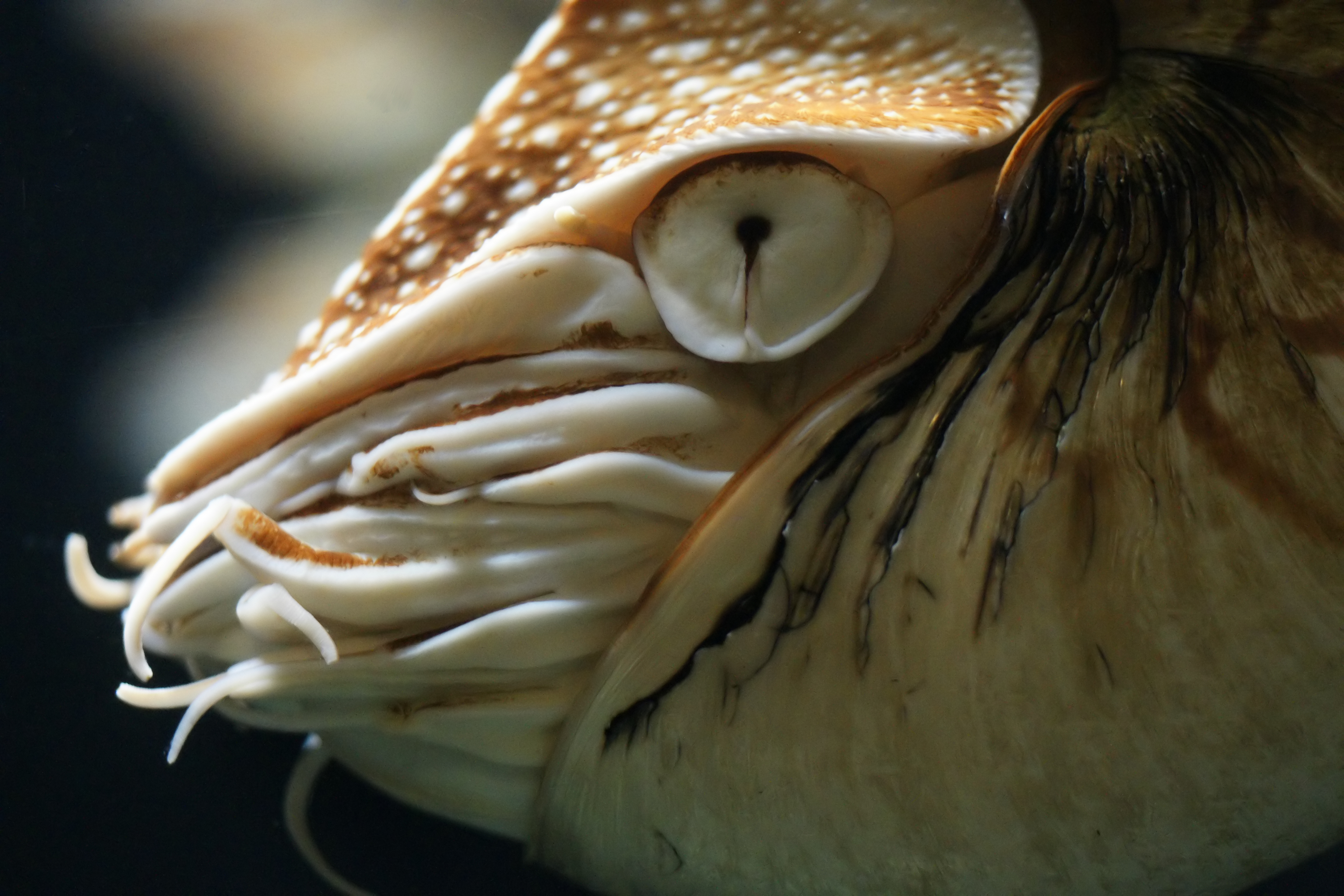
Nautilus (Nautilus pompilius) eye

== Evolutionary debate ==
Disagreement on whether the evolution of the camera eye within cephalopods and within vertebrates is a parallel evolution or a convergent evolution still exists, although is mostly resolved. The current standing is that of a convergent evolution for their analogous camera-type eye.

=== Parallel evolution ===
Those maintaining that it is a parallel evolution state that there is evidence that there was a common ancestor containing the genetic information for this eye development. This is evidenced by all bilaterian organisms containing the gene Pax6 which expresses for eye development.

=== Convergent evolution ===
Those supporting a convergent evolution state that this common ancestor would have preceded both cephalopods and vertebrates by a significant margin. The common ancestor with the expression for camera-type eye would have existed approximately 270 million years before the evolution of camera-type eye in cephalopods and approximately 110 to 260 million years before the evolution of camera-type eye in vertebrates. Another source of evidence for this is the differences of expression due to independent variants of Pax6 arising in both cephalopods and vertebrates. Cephalopods contain five variants of Pax6 in their genomes which independently arose and are not shared by vertebrates, although they allow for a similar gene expression when compared to the Pax6 of vertebrates.

== Research and medical use ==
The main medical use emerging in this field is for research on eye development and ocular diseases. New research studies on ocular gene expression are being performed using cephalopod eyes due to the evidence of their convergent evolution with the analogous human eye. These studies replace the previous Drosophila studies for gene expression during eye development as the most accurate, although Drosophila studies remain the most common. The conclusion that they are analogous lends credibility to their comparison for medical use in the first place, since the trait in both would have been shaped through natural selection by similar pressures in similar environments; meaning there would be similar expression of ocular disease in both organisms' eyes.

An advantage of cephalopod eye experimentation is that cephalopods can regenerate their eyes due to their ability to re-enable their developmental processes, which allows studies of the same cephalopod to continue past one trial sample when studying the effects of disease. This also permits for a more complex study concerning how regeneration may be conserved in cephalopod genomes and if it may be somewhat conserved in the human genome alongside the genes expressing for the camera eye.

== See also ==
- Mollusc eye – Visual organs of the phylum
- Octopus senses
- Squid nervous system
- Evolution of the eye – Origins and diversification of the organs of sight through geologic time
