= Til-Châtel =

- Commune
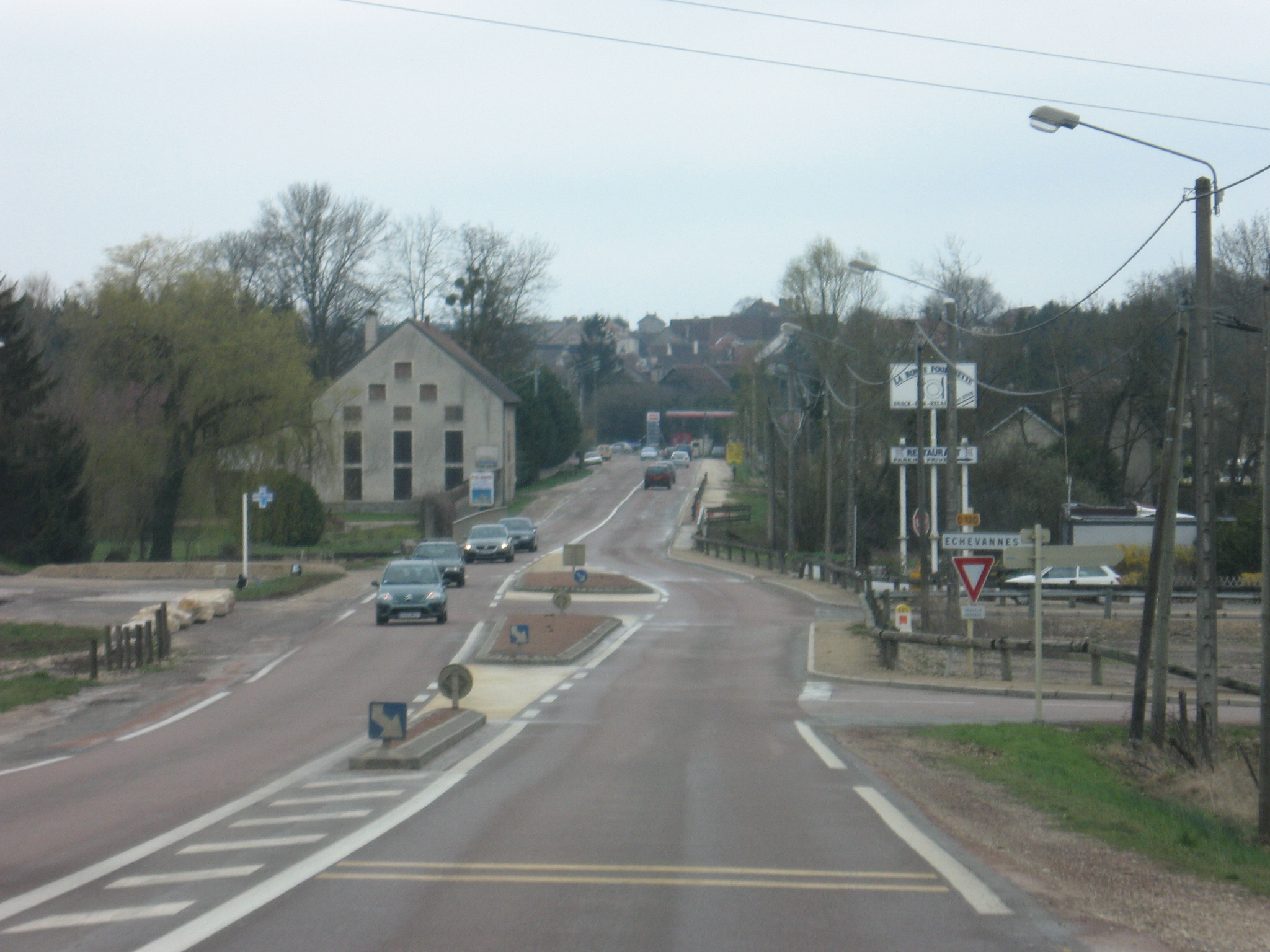
- The road through Til-Châtel

- Coat of arms
- Location of Til-Châtel
- Location within France Location within Bourgogne-Franche-Comté
- Coordinates: 47°31′07″N 5°10′31″E
- Country: France
- Region: Bourgogne-Franche-Comté
- Department: Côte-d'Or
- Arrondissement: Dijon
- Canton: Is-sur-Tille

Government
  - Mayor (2020–2026): Alain Gradelet
- Area^{1}: 26.37 km^{2} (10.18 sq mi)
- Elevation: 273 m (896 ft)
- Highest elevation: 349 m (1,145 ft)
- Lowest elevation: 256 m (840 ft)
- Population (2023): 1,113
  - Density: 42.21/km^{2} (109.3/sq mi)
- Time zone: UTC+01:00 (CET)
  - Summer (DST): UTC+02:00 (CEST)
- INSEE/Postal code: 21638 /21120
- ^{1} French Land Register data, which excludes lakes, ponds, glaciers > 1 km^{2} (0.386 sq mi or 247 acres) and river estuaries.

Til-Châtel (French pronunciation: [til ʃɑˈtɛl]) is a commune of the Côte-d'Or department in eastern France.

== Population ==
Historical population
Year	Pop.	±% p.a.
1968	731	—
1975	735	+0.08%
1982	755	+0.38%
1990	768	+0.21%
1999	819	+0.72%
2007	957	+1.97%
2012	1,037	+1.62%
2017	1,110	+1.37%
2023	1,113	+0.04%
Source: INSEE

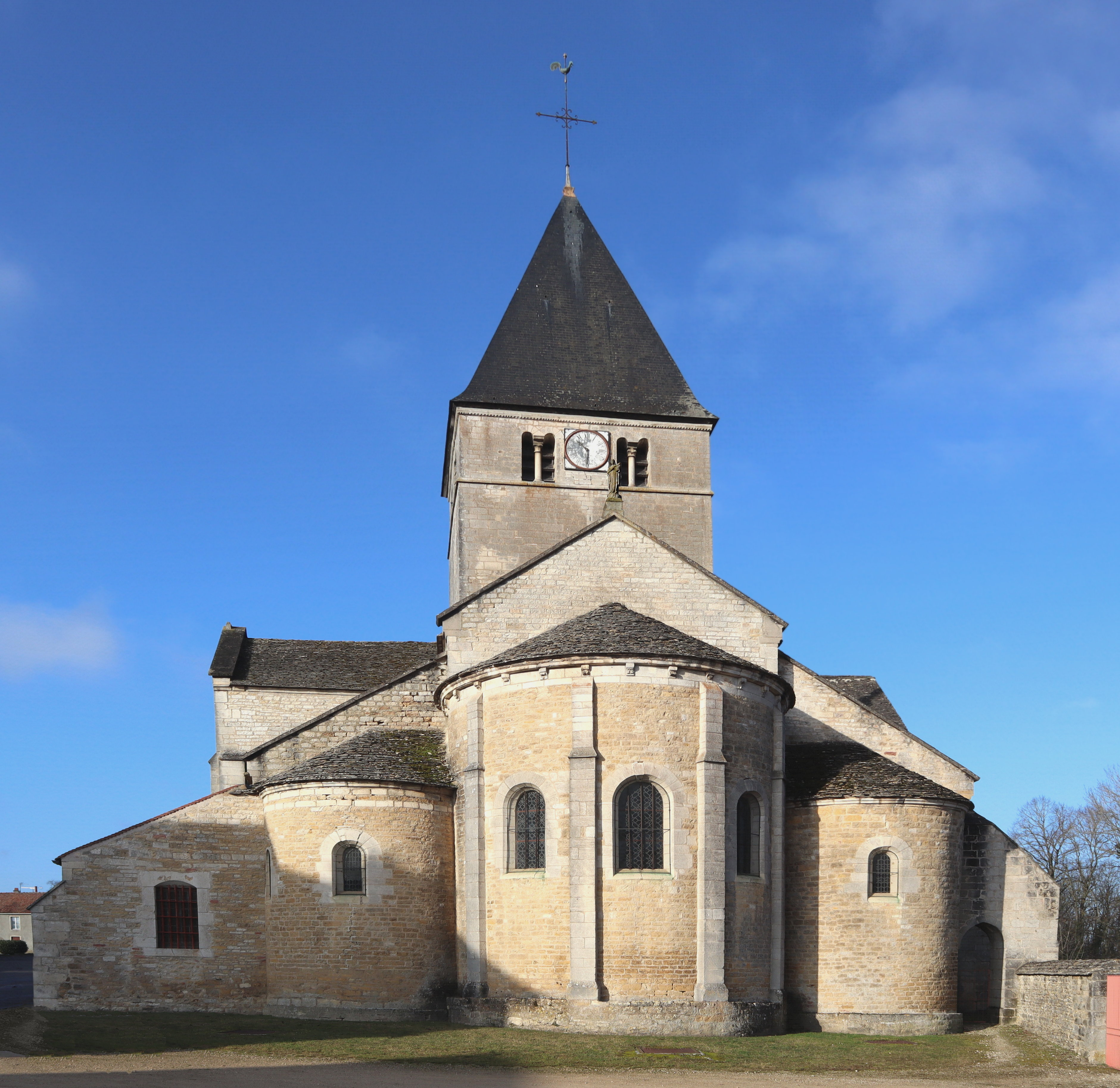
Church Saint-Florent-et-Saint-Honoré (12th century)

== See also ==
- Communes of the Côte-d'Or department
