= Chazeuil, Côte-d'Or =

Chazeuil
- Commune
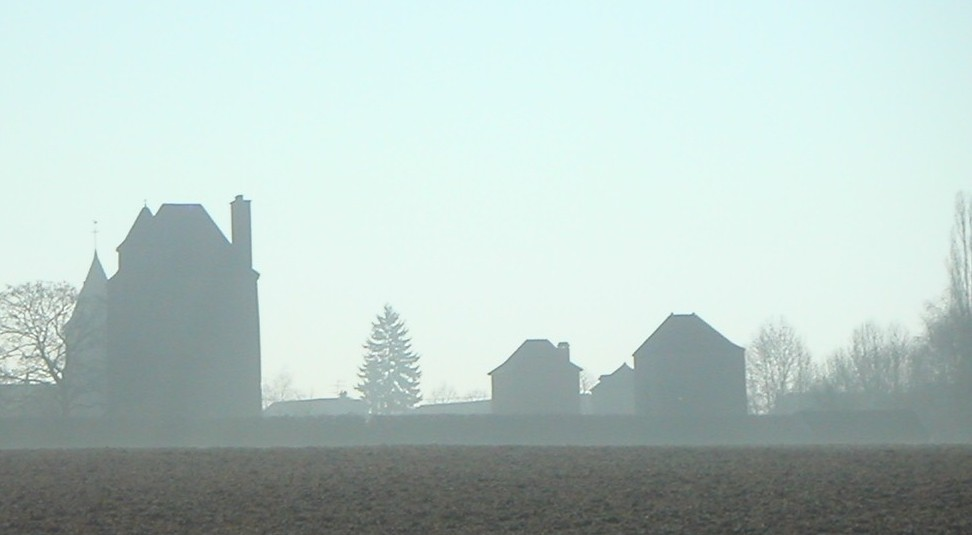
- Chateau
- Location of Chazeuil
- Location within France Location within Bourgogne-Franche-Comté
- Coordinates: 47°33′37″N 5°16′18″E
- Country: France
- Region: Bourgogne-Franche-Comté
- Department: Côte-d'Or
- Arrondissement: Dijon
- Canton: Is-sur-Tille

Government
  - Mayor (2020–2026): Marie-Pierre Cour
- Area^{1}: 18.55 km^{2} (7.16 sq mi)
- Elevation: 300 m (980 ft)
- Highest elevation: 322 m (1,056 ft)
- Lowest elevation: 253 m (830 ft)
- Population (2023): 195
  - Density: 10.5/km^{2} (27.2/sq mi)
- Time zone: UTC+01:00 (CET)
  - Summer (DST): UTC+02:00 (CEST)
- INSEE/Postal code: 21163 /21260
- ^{1} French Land Register data, which excludes lakes, ponds, glaciers > 1 km^{2} (0.386 sq mi or 247 acres) and river estuaries.

Chazeuil (French pronunciation: [ʃazœj]) is a commune in the Côte-d'Or department in eastern France.

== Population ==
Historical population
Year	Pop.	±% p.a.
1968	197	—
1975	168	−2.25%
1982	169	+0.08%
1990	188	+1.34%
1999	201	+0.75%
2007	222	+1.25%
2012	214	−0.73%
2017	197	−1.64%
2023	195	−0.17%
Source: INSEE

== See also ==
- Communes of the Côte-d'Or department
