= NACA duct =

Jet air inlet design

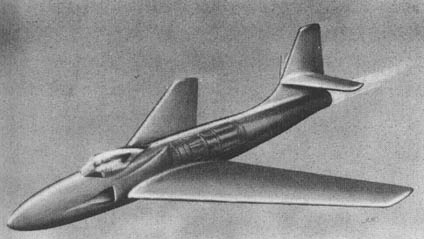
Concept picture of a submerged inlet for a jet aircraft

A NACA duct, also sometimes called a NACA scoop or NACA inlet, is a common form of low-drag air inlet design, originally developed by the U.S. National Advisory Committee for Aeronautics (NACA), the precursor to NASA, in 1945.

== Design ==
Prior submerged inlet experiments showed poor pressure recovery due to the slow-moving boundary layer entering the inlet. The NACA design is believed to work because the combination of the gentle ramp angle and the curvature profile of the walls creates counter-rotating vortices which deflect the boundary layer away from the inlet and draws in the faster moving air, while avoiding the form drag and flow separation that can occur with protruding scoop designs.

== Aircraft applications ==
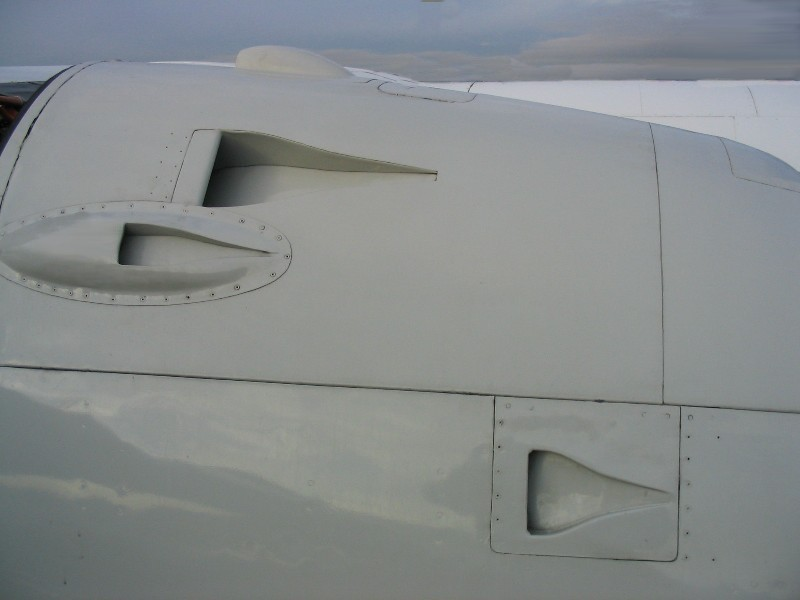
Three intakes (facing right) on an engine cowling

When properly implemented, a NACA duct allows air to flow into an internal duct, often for cooling purposes, with a minimal disturbance to the flow. The design was originally called a submerged inlet, since it consists of a shallow ramp with curved walls recessed into the exposed surface of a streamlined body, such as an aircraft.

This type of flush inlet generally cannot achieve the greater ram pressures and flow volumes of an external design, and so is rarely used for the jet engine intake application for which it was originally designed, such as the North American YF-93 and Short SB.4 Sherpa. It is commonly used for piston engine and ventilation intakes.

== Automobile applications ==
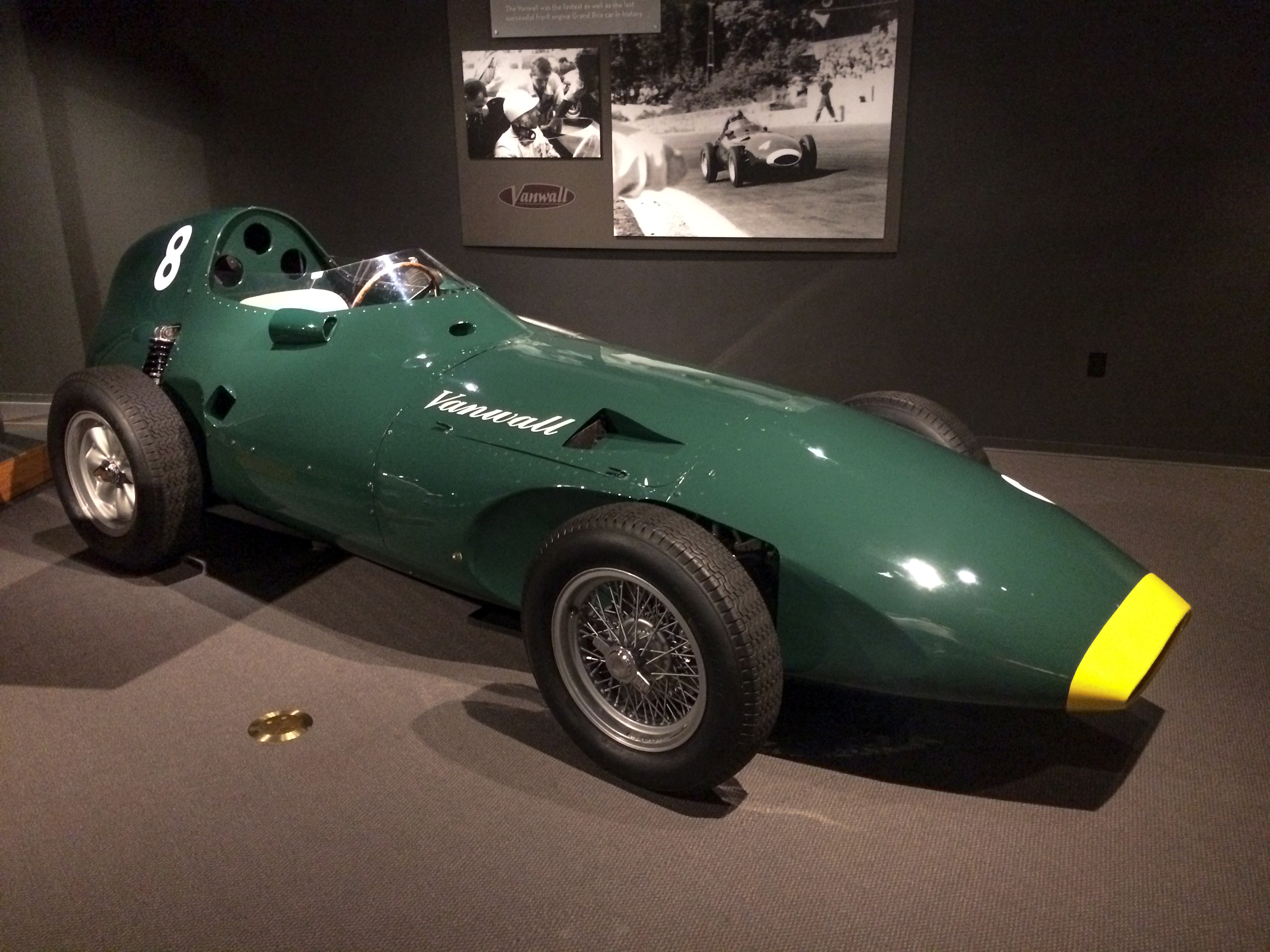
1958 Vanwall F1

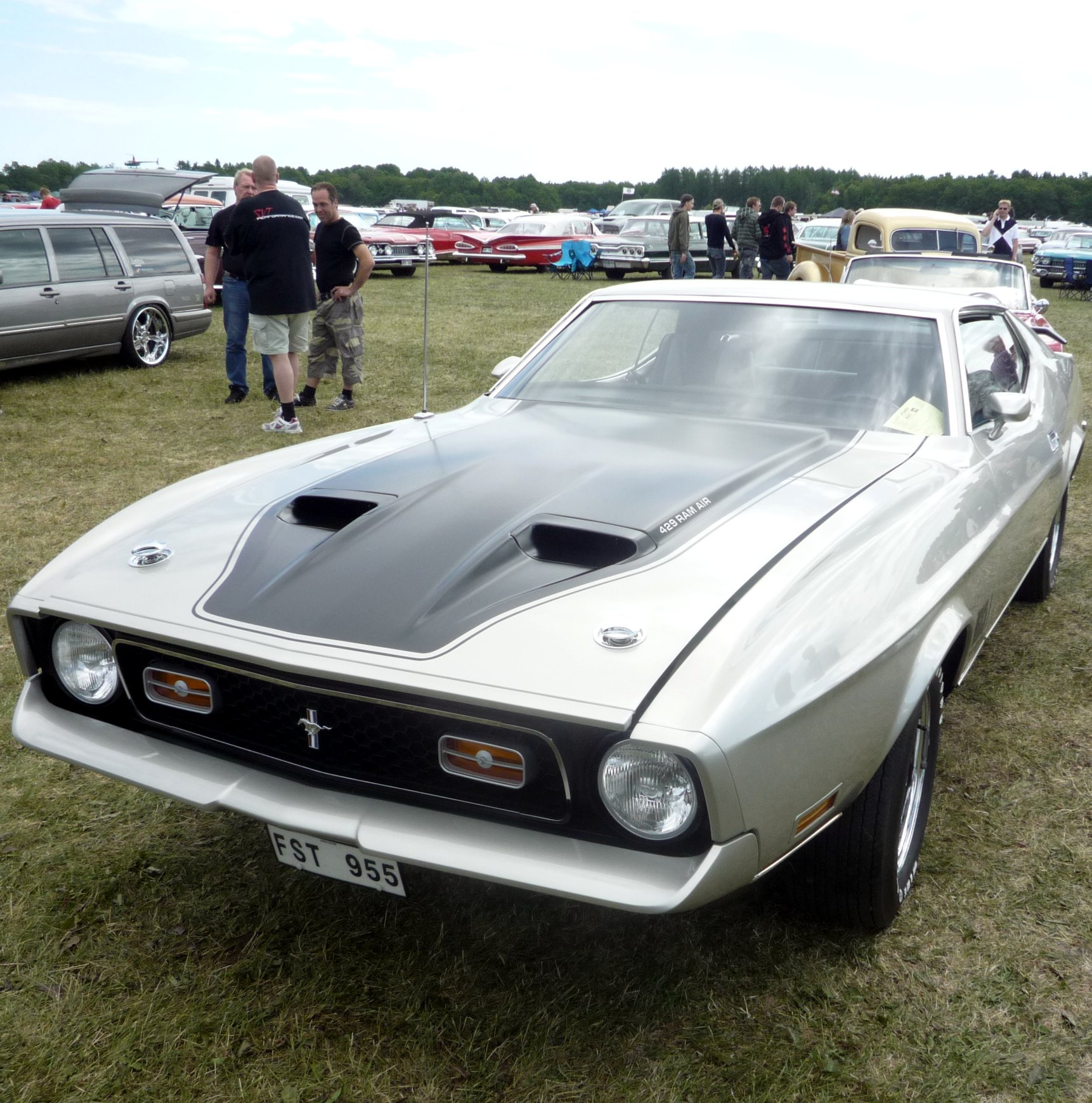
1971 Ford Mustang Mach 1 with hood scoops

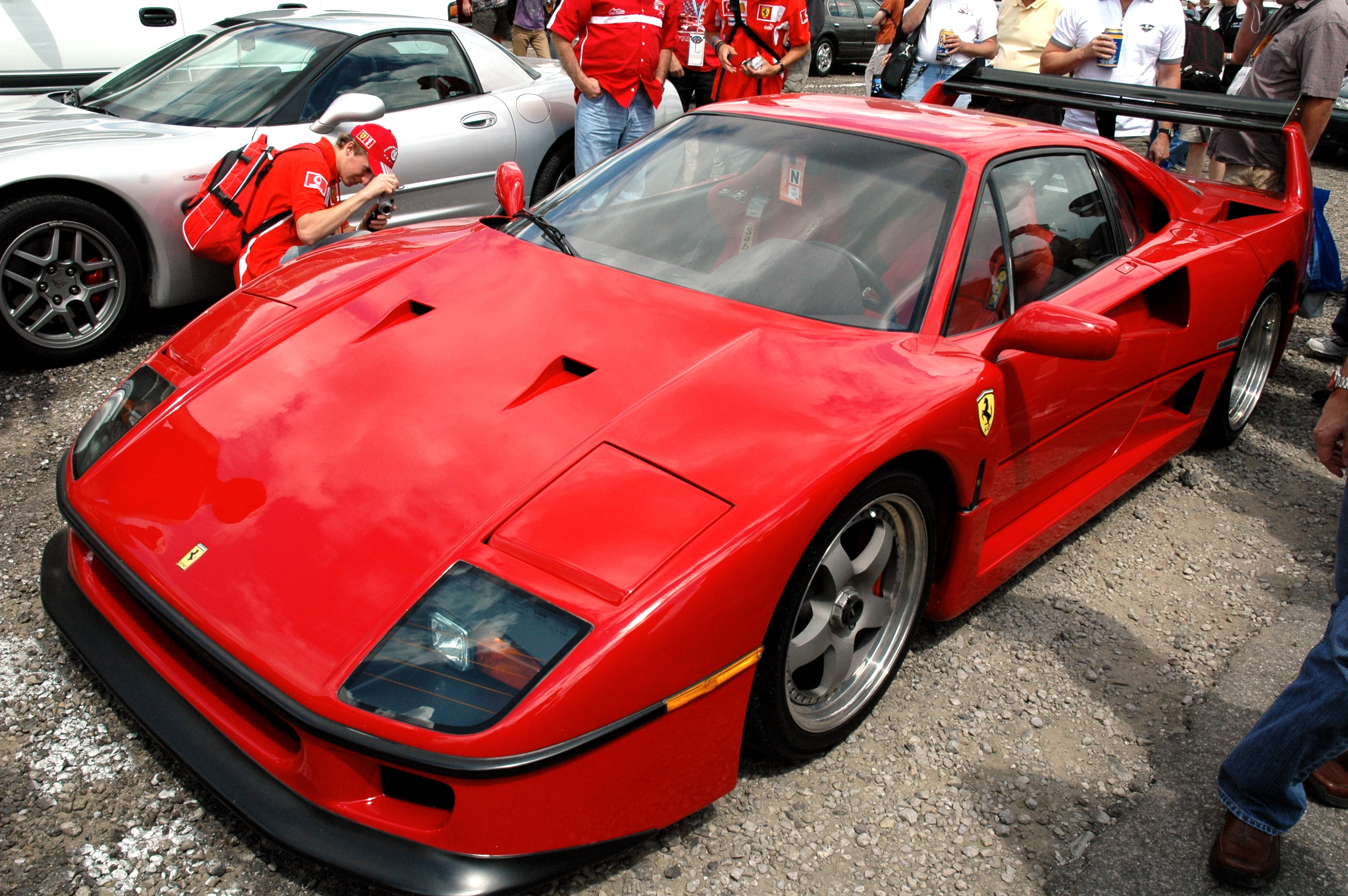
1987 Ferrari F40 with side and hood scoops

It is especially favored in racing car design, with the 1956 and later Vanwall Formula One cars being one of the first to replace a scoop with a NACA duct.

Sports cars featuring prominent NACA ducts include the

- Ford GT40
- Ferrari GTO
- 1970- Lamborghini Jarama
- 1971- Lamborghini Countach with prominent side scoop
- 1971–1973 Ford Mustang Mach 1
- 1973 Pontiac GTO
- 1979 Porsche 924 Turbo
- 1981 Maserati Biturbo
- 1978 Nissan S130
- 1987 Ferrari F40 and F80
- 1996–2002 Dodge Viper
- 2017 Porsche 911 GT2 (991)

It is also prevalent in some motorcycle designs, such as the 1994–1997 Honda VFR750F or the 1994–1998 Ducati 916.

== See also ==
- NACA airfoil
- NACA cowling
