= Propeller Research Tunnel =

United States wind tunnel

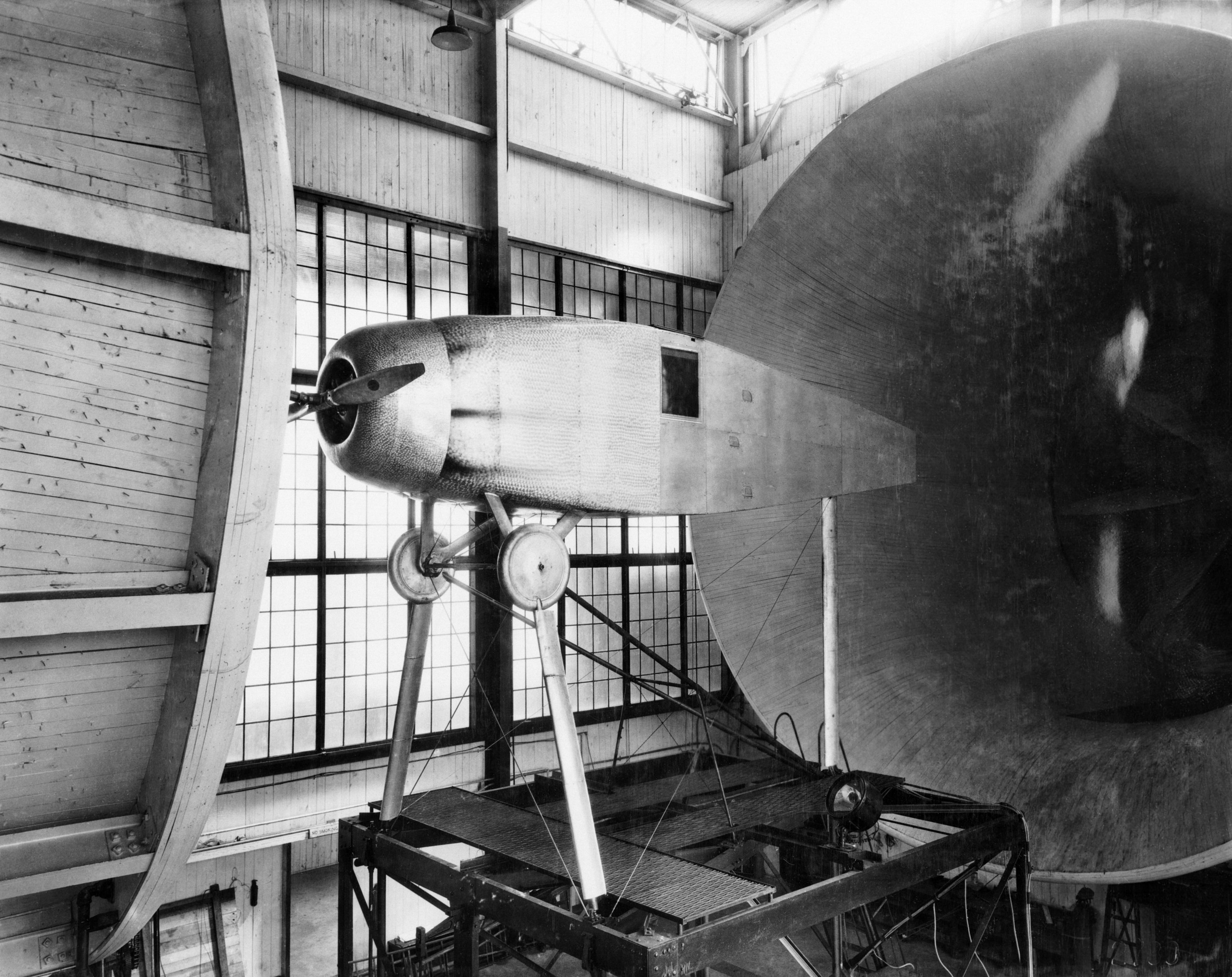
- A test fuselage in the Propeller Research Tunnel at Langley Research Center with Cowling No. 10, a prototype cowling designed to reduce drag caused by an exposed radial engine. (NASA,1926)
- Acronym: PRT
- Other names: Wind Tunnel No. 3
- Uses: Wind tunnel for full-scale aircraft used primarily in reducing drag caused by propellers and exposed engines
- Notable experiments: Engine cowling, the NACA cowling, retractable landing gear
- Related items: National Advisory Committee for Aeronautics, Langley Research Center

The Propeller Research Tunnel (PRT) was the first full-scale wind tunnel at the National Advisory Committee for Aeronautics (NACA) Langley Memorial Aeronautical Laboratory (later the Langley Research Center), and the third at the facility. It was in use between 1927 and 1950 and was instrumental in the drag reduction research of early American aeronautics. In 1929, NACA was awarded its first Collier Trophy for its development of the NACA cowling, which was tested and developed using the Propeller Research Tunnel.

== Purpose ==
The main purpose of the Propeller Research Tunnel was researching the aerodynamic efficiency of propellers on radial-engined aircraft. In 1917, William F. Durand published NACA Technical Report 17 on his work with isolated propellers in Stanford University's wind tunnel, but his results did not match with the data NACA had collected for propellers connected to fuselages. Additionally, little was known about the limitations of propellers. Propellers had efficiency issues caused by loss of compression at the tips at high speeds. In 1923, Langley engineer Fred Weick, suggested NACA build a wind tunnel with a 20-foot (6.1-metre) diameter throat, capable of speeds up to 100 miles per hour (161 km/h) in order to perform full-scale propeller tests. According to Weick, British engineers were running tests on scale propellers at the time, but were unable to obtain accurate results due to a scaling issue related to the Reynolds number in the smaller wind tunnels. NACA had been using the Variable Density Tunnel in order to increase the density of air to keep the Reynolds number in testing similar to the Reynolds number experienced by full-scale aircraft. However, the Variable Density Tunnel was not able to provide consistent data for propellers, so NACA built the Propeller Research Tunnel.

== History ==
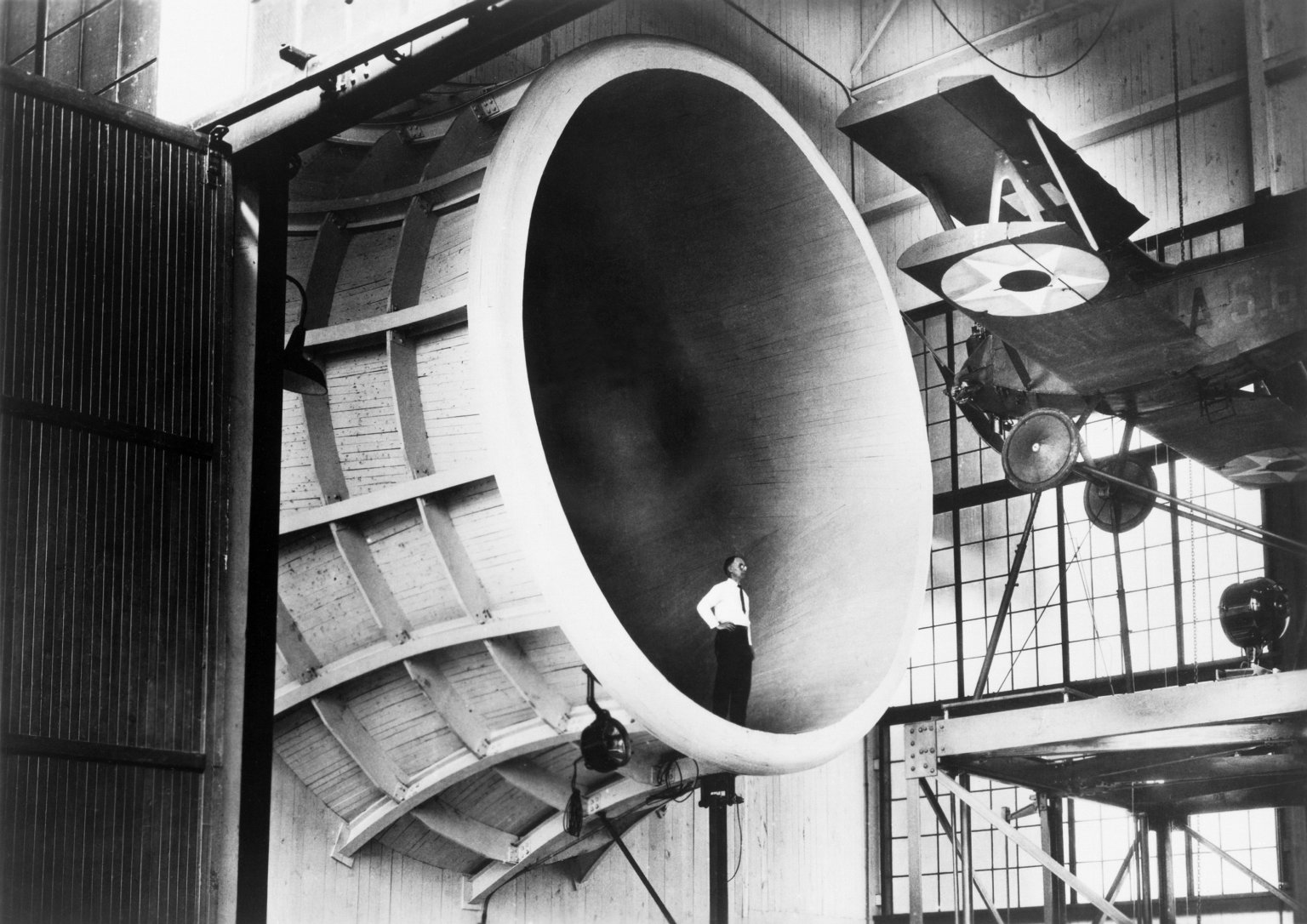
Elton W. Miller, NACA Chief of Aerodynamics following the resignation of Max Munk, stands inside the exit cone of the Propeller Research Tunnel looking at the Sperry M-1 Messenger, the first full-scale plane to be tested in the tunnel. (NASA, 1927)

NACA began work on the Propeller Research Tunnel under direction of Director of Aeronautical Research George W. Lewis in 1925 and completed its construction in 1927. Built using two 1,000-horsepower (746-kilowatt) diesel submarine engines and an eight-blade, 27-foot (8.2-metre) diameter fan, the Propeller Research Tunnel could push air in a 20-foot (6.1-metre) stream at 110 miles per hour (177 km/h). The PRT remained operational until it was demolished in 1950 when NACA needed a place to build its 8-foot (2.4-metre) Transonic Pressure Tunnel.

== Use in Research ==
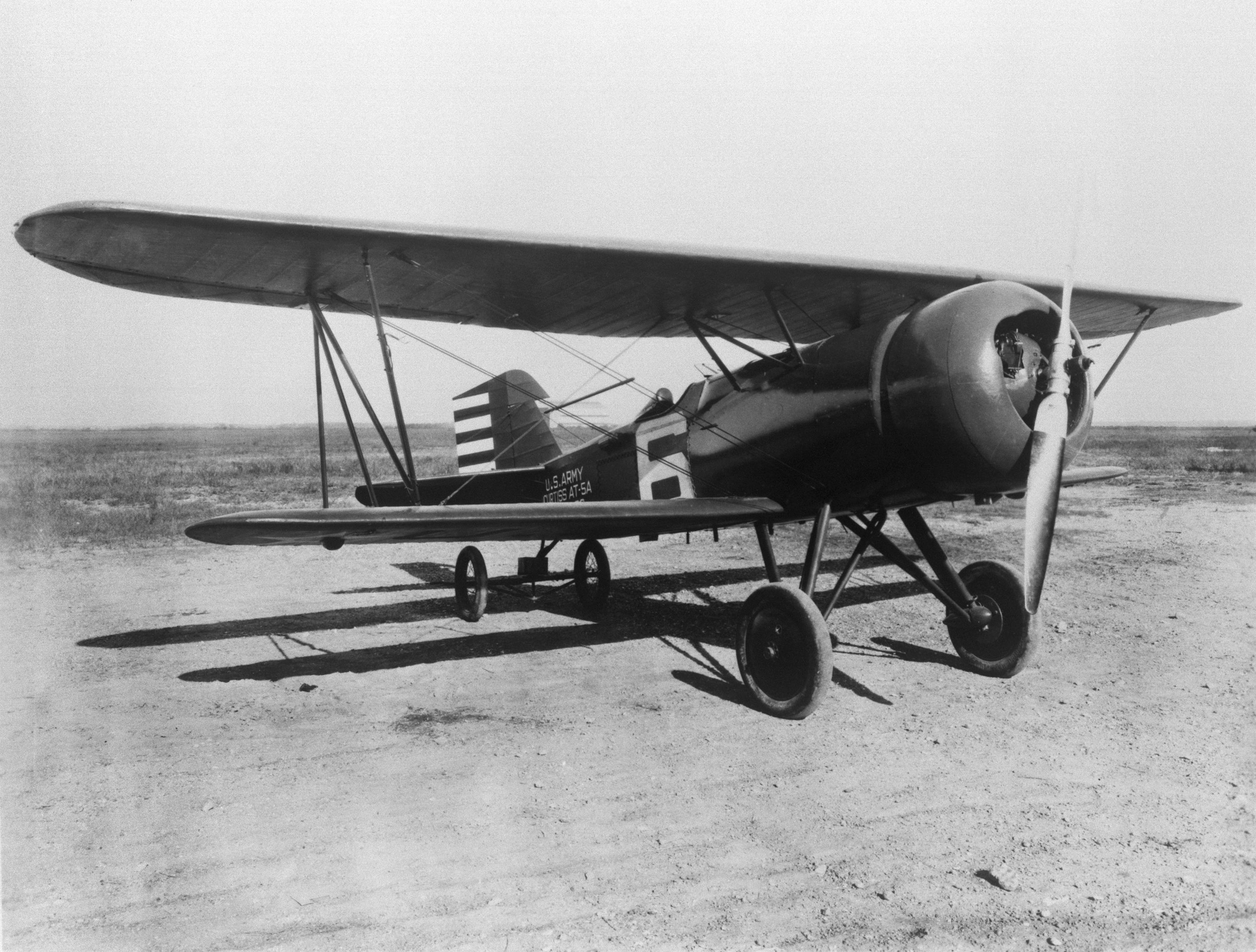
The NACA cowling on a Curtiss AT-5A Hawk (NASA, 1928)

=== Propeller Research ===
The Propeller Research Tunnel was used in the development of more efficient propellers that did not lose compression at the blade tips at high speeds. NACA was also able to test full scale propellers to find a blade shape that maximized efficiency and performance where previous designs had failed.

=== NACA cowling ===
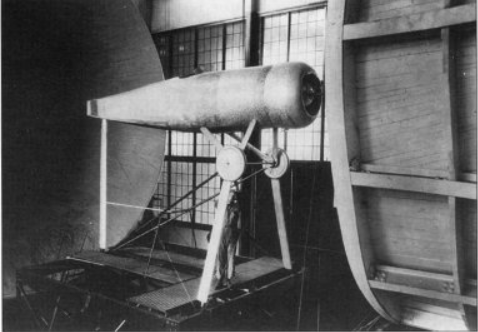
"Cowling No. 10," prototype of the NACA cowling, in the Propeller Research Tunnel, ca. September 1928.

The PRT was also used to develop a way to reduce the drag produced by the exposed pistons of radial turbine engines. By testing various cowlings on full-scale models in the PRT, NACA was able to produce the NACA cowl, which won the Collier Trophy in 1929 for its impact on aeronautics. It was predicted that the cowling, by reducing drag and increasing engine cooling, would save the American aircraft industry upwards of $5 million, and the cowling and its variants were quickly adopted by plane manufacturers.

=== Other ===
Similarly, the PRT found that engine placement and the fixed landing gear contributed greatly to drag. NACA engineers worked to create a retractable landing gear and found that multi-engine planes benefited from having their engines in-line with the leading edge of the wing. Both of these discoveries were also quickly adopted by airplane manufacturers. Data collected in the PRT was used heavily in the design of many World War II planes including the Boeing B-17 Flying Fortress, Consolidated B-24 Liberator, and the Douglas DC-3.

== See also ==
- Langley Research Center
- NACA cowling
- Collier Trophy
