= Hood scoop =

Opening for air to enter car engines

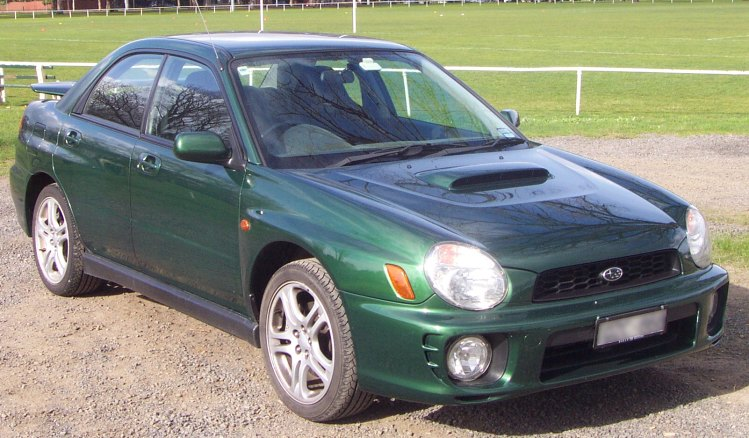
Functional hood scoop on a Subaru Impreza WRX

A hood scoop (North American English) or bonnet scoop (Commonwealth English), sometimes called bonnet airdam and air dam, is an upraised component on the hood of a motor vehicle that either allows air to directly enter the engine compartment or appears to do so. It has only one opening and is closed on all other sides. Its upraised design allows it to effectively channel air directly into the engine compartment without the need to pass through the normal intake ducting. Some hood scoops are always closed and serve as decoration rather than performance.

== Hood scoop functions ==
=== Cool air ===
In most modern vehicles, internal combustion engines "breathe" under-hood air or air ducted from under the front bumper through plastic and rubber tubing. The high operating temperatures in the engine compartment result in intake air that is 28°C (82°F) or warmer than the ambient temperature and consequently, less dense. A hood scoop can provide the engine with cooler, denser outside air, increasing power.

=== Ram air ===
At higher road speeds, a properly designed hood scoop known as ram-air intake can increase the speed and pressure with which air enters the engine's intake, creating a resonance supercharging effect. Such effects are typically only felt at very high speeds, making ram air primarily useful for racing, not street performance.

Pontiac used the trade name Ram Air to describe its engines equipped with functional scoops. Despite the name, most of these systems only provided cool air, with little or no supercharging effect.

=== Intercooler scoops ===
Some engines with turbochargers or superchargers are also equipped with top mounted intercoolers to reduce the temperature and increase the density of the high-pressure air produced by the compressor. Channeling outside air to the intercooler (which is a heat exchanger similar to a radiator) increases its effectiveness, providing a significant improvement in power.

== Scoop design ==
To be effective, a functional scoop must be located at a high-pressure area on the hood. For that reason, some functional scoops are located at the rear of the hood, near the vehicle's cowl, where the curvature of the windshield creates such a high-pressure zone and may be placed so that their opening faces the windshield (a reversed scoop).

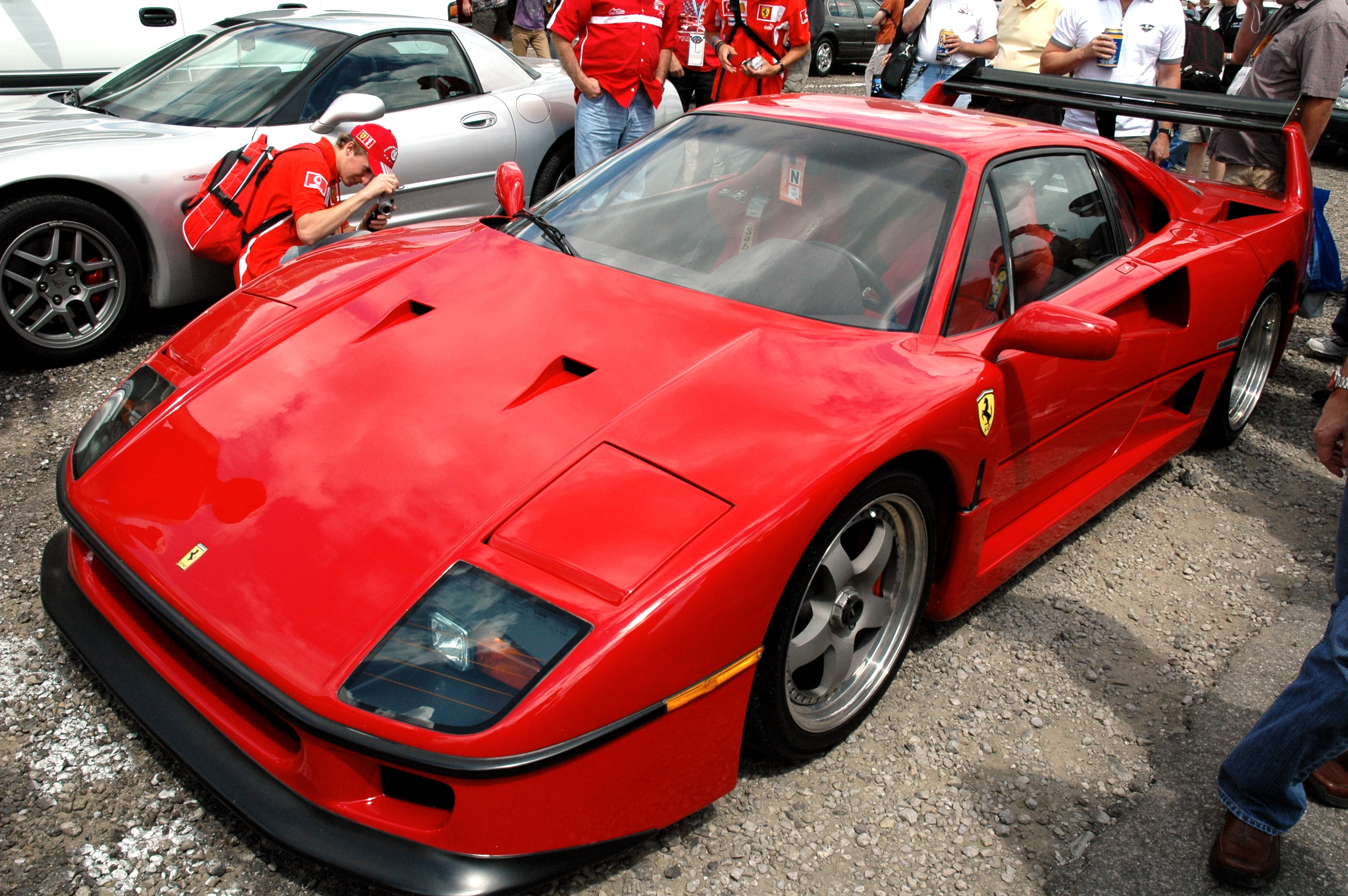
NACA-style hood scoops on the Ferrari F40.

The scoop will be most effective if it is either mounted high enough to clear the boundary layer (the slow-moving air that clings to the surface of a moving object) or if it is a NACA duct, mounted below the surface and designed to draw the faster-moving air outside of the boundary layer into the duct. A shallow scoop that is not a NACA duct may not admit a useful amount of air even if it is open.

Under the hood, an effective scoop must funnel air into the engine's intake in as short and direct a path as possible, preferably through a tube or channel that is insulated against underhood heat.

A scoop may be part of the hood or may be part of the engine's air cleaner assembly, protruding through a hole cut into the bonnet. Such a scoop is called a shaker hood, because the scoop vibrates noticeably when the engine is running, especially under power.

=== Hood scoops and off-road racing ===
A hood scoop/top mounted intercooler can be beneficial, especially during an off-road rally race. Rocks and debris can be kicked up by a car in front, and those objects can damage a front-mounted intercooler. However, rock guards can be installed to prevent this problem.
