= NACA cowling =

Aircraft engine fairing

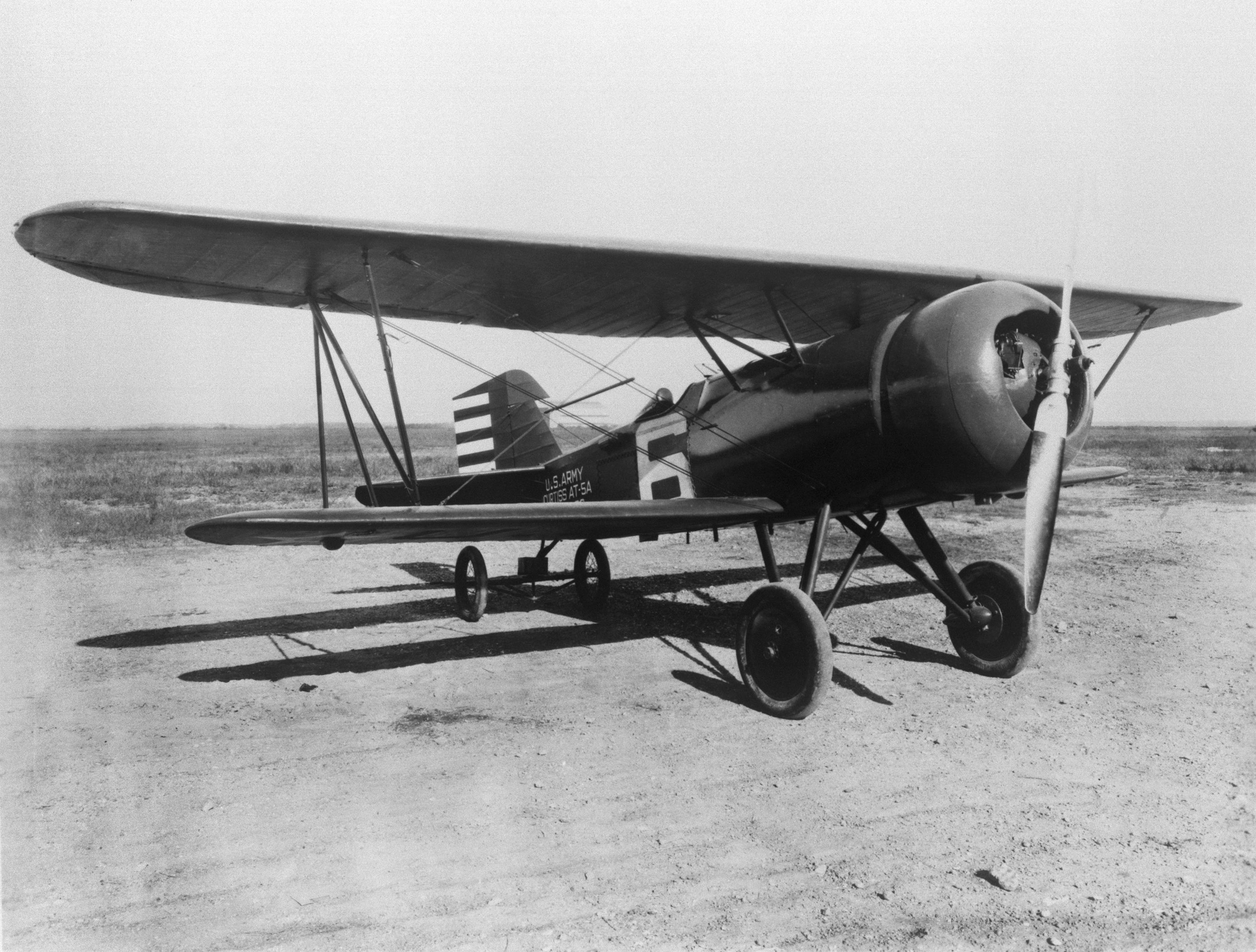
Curtiss AT-5A Hawk with NACA cowling at the Langley Memorial Aeronautical Laboratory, October 1928

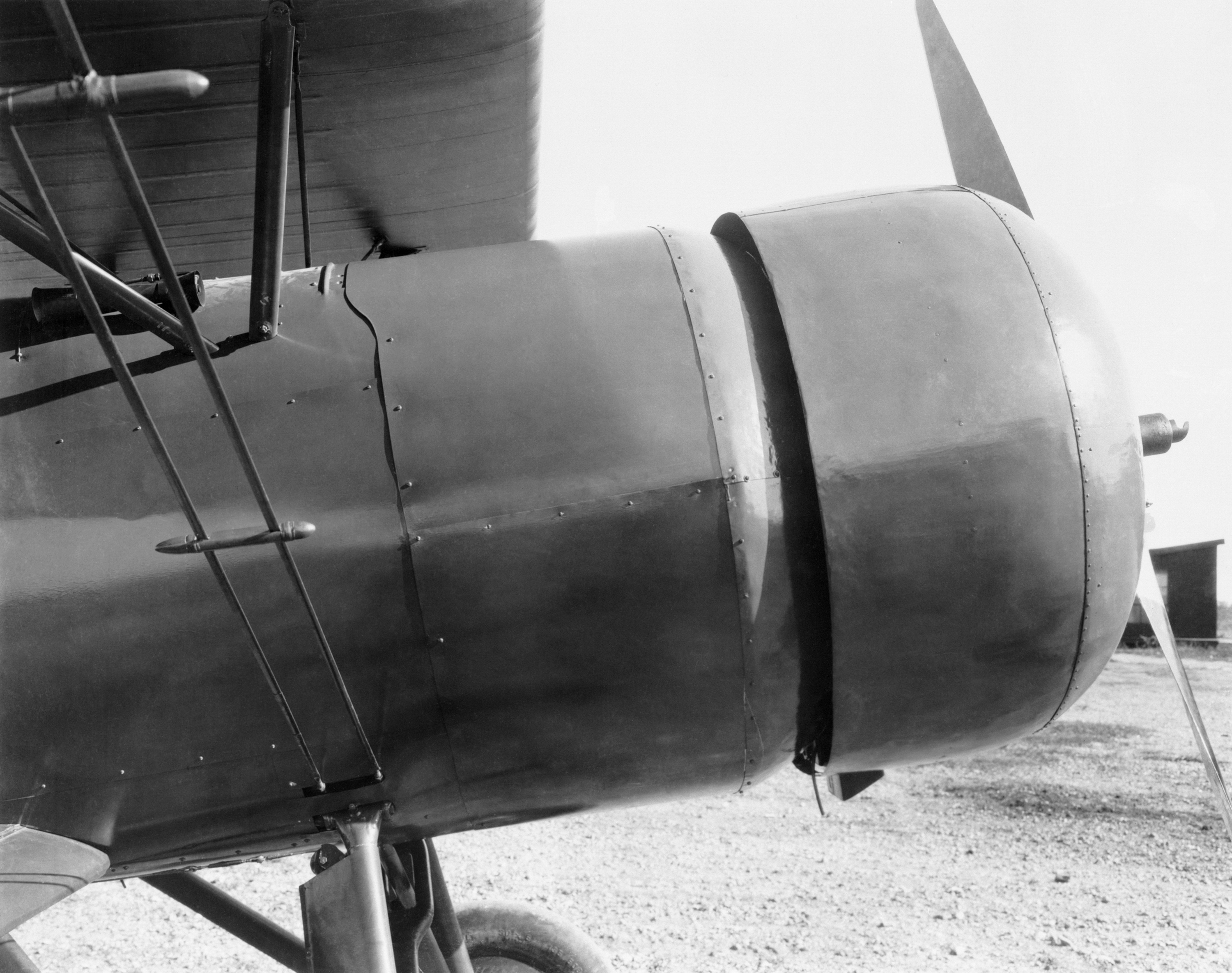
Close-up of the cowling on the Curtiss AT-5A

The NACA cowling is a type of aerodynamic fairing used to streamline radial engines installed on airplanes. It was developed by Fred Weick of the National Advisory Committee for Aeronautics (NACA) in 1927. It was a major advancement in aerodynamic drag reduction, and paid for its development and installation costs many times over due to the gains in fuel efficiency that it enabled. NACA won the 1929 Collier Trophy for its development.

== History and design ==
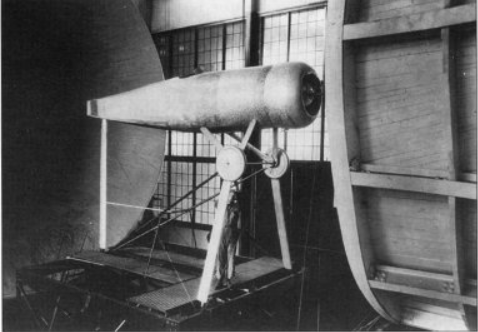
"Cowling No. 10" in the Propeller Research Tunnel at the Langley Memorial Aeronautical Laboratory at Langley Field, Virginia, ca. September 1928. It became the NACA cowling.

The NACA cowling enhanced speed through drag reduction while improving both engine cooling and fuel consumption.

The cowling consists of a symmetric, circular airfoil that is wrapped around the engine. In a normal planar airfoil, like a wing, the difference in airspeeds, and their associated changes in pressure, on the top and bottom surfaces, enhances lift. In the case of the NACA cowl, the ring-shaped airfoil is positioned so this lift effect is forward. This thrust does not fully counter the drag of the cowl but greatly mitigates it.

The difference in airspeed on the two sides is due not only to the shape of the airfoil, but also the presence of the cylinders on the inside surface, which serves to further slow the airflow. Nevertheless, the total airflow through the cowl is generally greater than it would be with no cowl as the air is sucked through the cowl by the air flowing around it. This has the side-effect of keeping the fast moving air primarily on the cylinder heads where it is most needed, as opposed to flowing between the cylinders and crankcase where it does little for cooling. Furthermore, turbulence after the air passes the free-standing cylinders is greatly reduced. The sum of all these effects reduces drag by as much as 60%. The test conclusions resulted in almost every radial-engined aircraft being equipped with this cowling, starting in 1932.

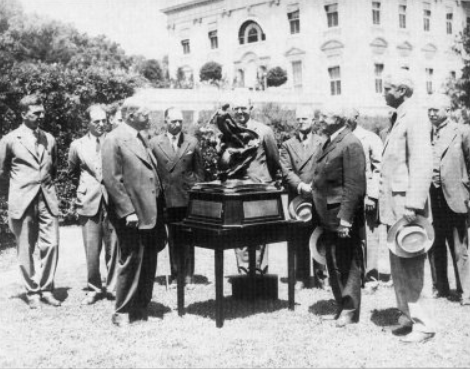
President Herbert Hoover presents the 1929 Collier Trophy to Dr. Joseph S. Ames of the National Advisory Committee for Aeronautics for NACA's development of the NACA cowling in a ceremony on the grounds of the White House in Washington, D.C., on 3 June 1930.

The test aircraft, a Curtiss AT-5A Hawk biplane, featuring a Wright Whirlwind J-5 radial engine, reached an airspeed of 137 miles per hour (220 km/h) equipped with the NACA cowling compared to 118 miles per hour (190 km/h) without it. Thomas Carroll tested the engine cowling as chief test pilot at Langley in 1929.

The idea that the NACA cowling produced thrust through the Meredith effect is fallacious—although in theory the expansion of the air as it was heated by the engine could create some thrust by exiting at high speed, in practice this required a cowling designed and shaped to achieve the high-speed exit of air required (which the NACA cowling was not), and in any case, at 1930s airspeeds, the effect was negligible.

== See also ==
- NACA airfoil
- NACA duct
- Townend ring

== Other source ==
- Aeronautic exhibit in Smithsonian Institution, Washington, D.C.
