= Ferrari GTO =

Ferrari has made three models named GTO (for omologata, homologated according to FIA racing rules):

- 1962-64 Ferrari 250 GTO
- 1984-87 Ferrari 288 GTO
- 2011 Ferrari 599 GTO
