= Guan De =

Guan De (Chinese: 管德; 12 July 1932 – 9 January 2018) was a Chinese aeroelasticity engineer and aircraft designer. He participated in the design and development of the Shenyang JJ-1 jet trainer and the Shenyang J-8 and J8-II interceptors. He served as Chief Engineer and Vice President of Shenyang Aircraft Corporation, Deputy Director of the Civil Aviation Administration of China, and professor of Beihang University. He was an academician of the Chinese Academy of Engineering.

== Biography ==
Guan was born 12 July 1932 in Beiping (now Beijing), Republic of China. His father, Yin Fengming (尹凤鸣), was educated in Japan, taught at the Baoding Military Academy, and held the rank of major general. Because of Japanese invasion of China, Guan did not go to school and was educated at home until the end of the Second Sino-Japanese War in 1945. After the war, he entered Beijing No. 5 High School and then the Department of Aeronautics of Tsinghua University.

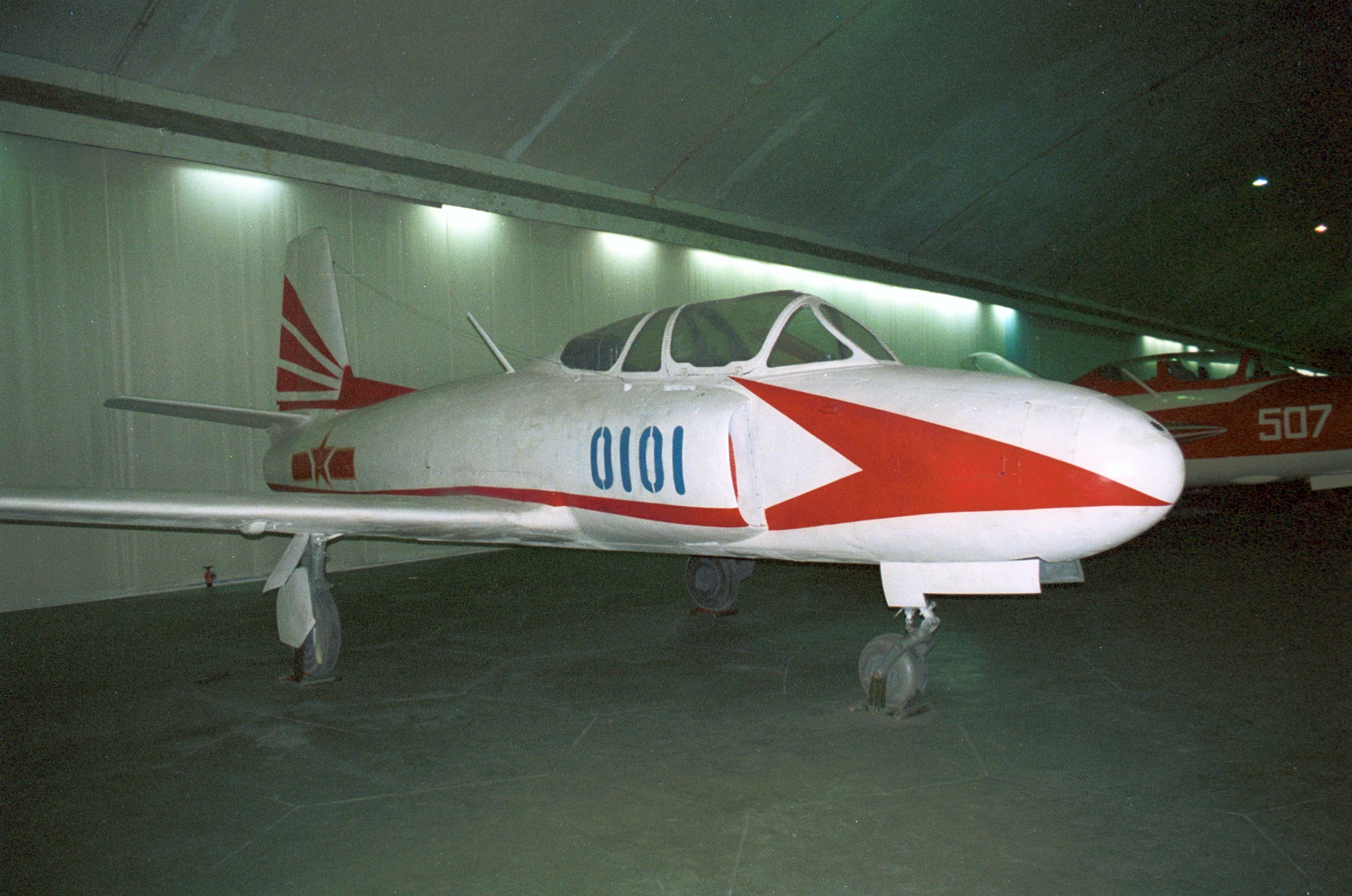
Shenyang JJ-1 jet trainer

After graduating from Tsinghua in 1952, he was assigned to work at the Bureau of Aviation Industry under the Second Ministry of Machine Building. In August 1956, Guan was transferred to the newly established Aircraft Design Office of Shenyang Aircraft Corporation (then known as the 112 Factory), where he worked under director Xu Shunshou and deputy directors Ye Zhengda and Huang Zhiqian. He was one of the key engineers who designed the Shenyang JJ-1 jet trainer.

Guan De was the first person in China to study aeroelasticity. When the 601 Institute of the Ministry of National Defense was established in 1961, Guan was named the head of its aeroelasticity group. Beginning in 1964, he participated in the design of the Shenyang J-8 interceptor fighter aircraft. He was later promoted to Vice President of the 601 Institute.

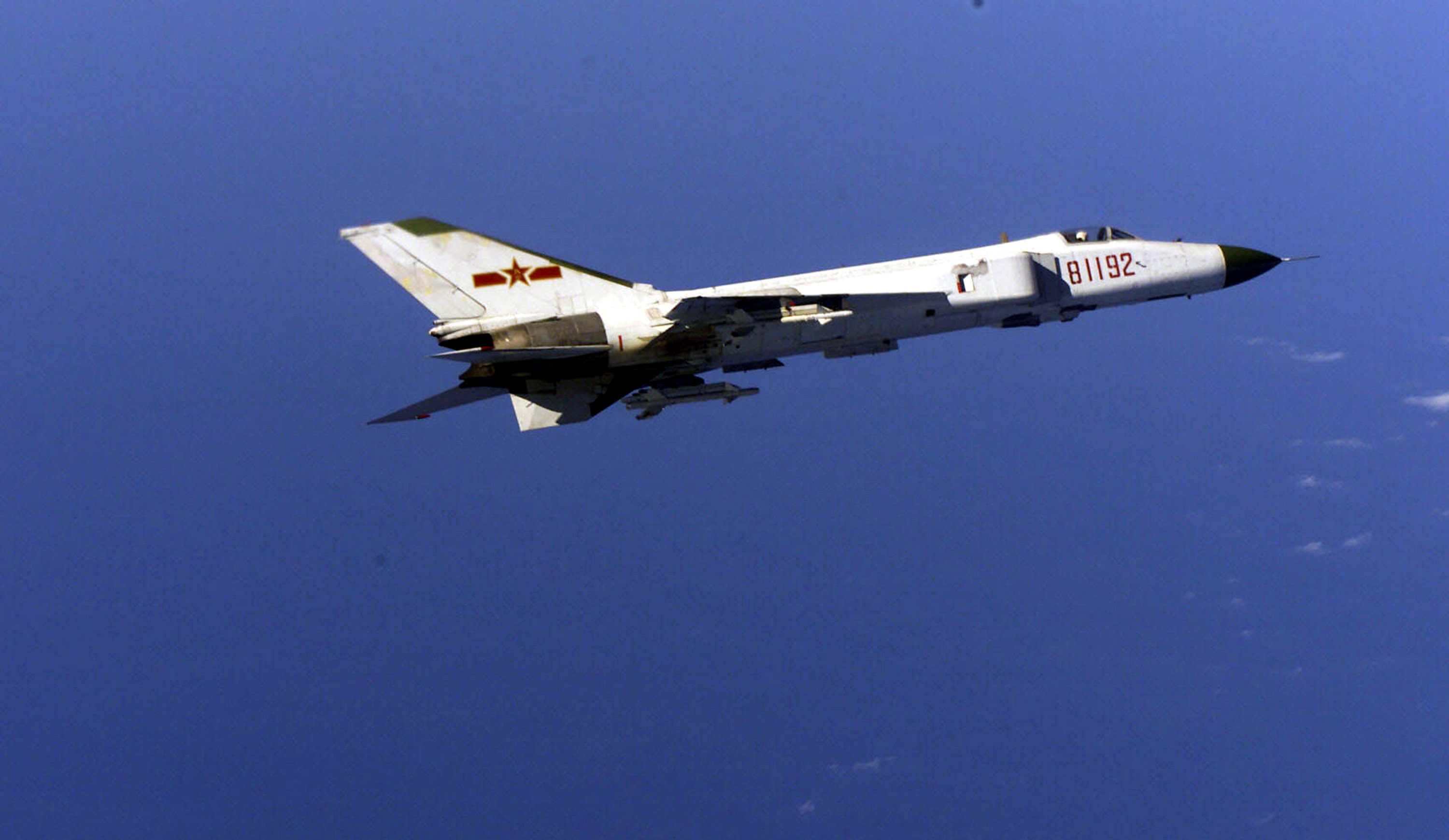
Shenyang J-8II interceptor

In September 1982, Guan was appointed Chief Engineer and Vice President of Shenyang Aircraft Corporation. He was the on-site director of the Shenyang J-8II interceptor, working with chief designer Gu Songfen.

In 1985, Guan was appointed Deputy Director of the Civil Aviation Administration of China. He also taught as an adjunct professor and Ph.D. advisor at the Beijing University of Aeronautics and Astronautics (now Beihang University).

Guan was diagnosed with kidney cancer in 1991. He survived the disease after undergoing nephrectomy, but was limited to working no more than six hours a week afterwards. He died on 9 January 2018 in Beijing, at the age of 85.

== Awards ==
In 1978, Guan's research on aeroelasticity won the National Science Congress Award and the State Science and Technology Progress Award (Second Class). He was also awarded a Special Prize of the State Science and Technology Progress Award for his contributions to the development of the Shenyang J-8 and J-8II aircraft. He was elected a founding academician of the Chinese Academy of Engineering in 1994.
