= Huang Zhiquan =

Huang Zhiquan may refer to:

- Huang Zhiquan (politician, born 1908) (黃穉荃; 1908–1993), Chinese politician and member of the Legislative Yuan
- Huang Zhiquan (politician, born 1942) (黄智权; 1942–2026), Chinese politician and Governor of Jiangxi

== See also ==
- Huang Zhiqian (1914–1965), Chinese aircraft designer
