= Xu Shunshou =

Chinese aircraft designer

- 徐舜寿
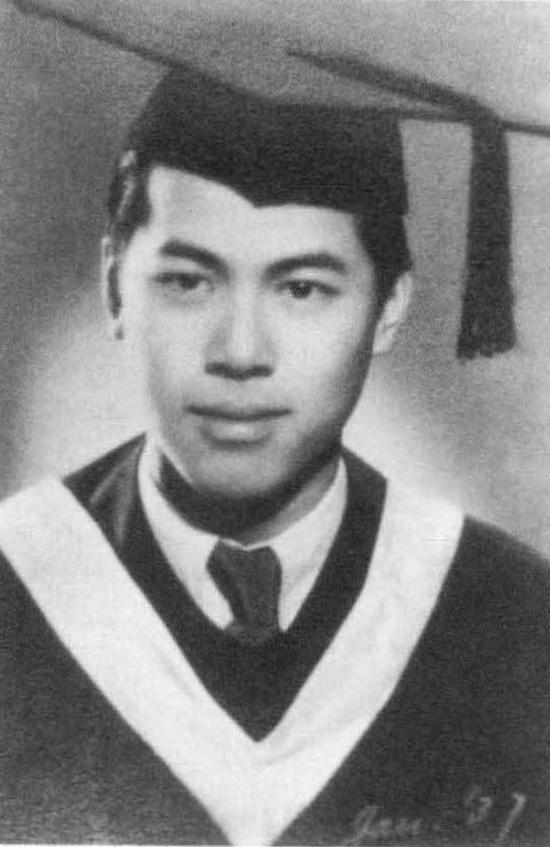
- Xu Shunshou at graduation from Tsinghua University (1937)
- Born: August 21, 1917; Shanghai, Republic of China
- Died: January 6, 1968 (aged 50); Beijing, People's Republic of China
- Occupation: Aeronautical engineer
- Spouse: Song Shubi (m. 1946–1968)
- Children: 3

Xu Shunshou (Chinese: 徐舜寿; pinyin: Xú Shùnshòu; Wade–Giles: Hsü Shun-shou; 21 August 1917 – 6 January 1968) was a Chinese aircraft designer and a founder of the aircraft manufacturing industry in the People's Republic of China. He was the founding director of the PRC's first aircraft design organization (later the Shenyang Aircraft Design Institute), where he oversaw the development of the Shenyang JJ-1, the first jet aircraft designed in China. He trained many of the country's top aircraft designers and also participated in the design of the Nanchang CJ-6 trainer, the Nanchang Q-5 jet attack aircraft, and the Xian H-6 bomber. He was severely persecuted during the Cultural Revolution and died at the age of 50.

== Republic of China ==
Xu Shunshou was born on 21 August 1917 in Shanghai, Republic of China, the youngest child of Xu Yibing, an educator and a member of Sun Yat-sen's revolutionary group Tongmenghui. When he was three, his family returned to their hometown Nanxun, in Huzhou, Zhejiang Province. He lost his father at a young age. In 1930, Xu attended secondary school in Nanjing, then China's capital. Two years later, the January 28 incident broke out and the Japanese army attacked Shanghai and threatened Nanjing. For safety, Xu transferred to the missionary Kashing High School (now Xiuzhou High School) in Jiaxing, near his hometown.

Xu entered the Department of Mechanical Engineering of Tsinghua University in 1933. Upon graduation four years later with a bachelor's degree in aerospace engineering, he briefly worked at the Central Aircraft Manufacturing Company in Jianqiao, Hangzhou, before entering the special aviation mechanics program of the National Central University in Nanjing. The Second Sino-Japanese War soon broke out in July 1937 and Nanjing fell to Japanese occupation. The National Central University relocated to Chongqing, China's wartime capital. Upon graduation in March 1939, Xu joined the Republic of China Air Force and served at the technical research office of the air force's aviation committee in Chengdu.

In 1942, Xu was sent by the Kuomintang government to work and train at the McDonnell Aircraft Corporation in the United States, where he participated in the design of jet interceptors. After the end of World War II, Xu returned to China and worked at the No. 2 Aircraft Manufacturing Factory in Chongqing (later moved back to Nanchang after the war).

== People's Republic of China ==
When the Communist Party defeated the Kuomintang in the Chinese Civil War and established the People's Republic of China in 1949, Xu stayed in mainland China and worked for the Aviation Industry Bureau of the Ministry of Heavy Industry. As the PRC was receiving technical assistance from the Soviet Union, Xu taught himself Russian and translated several Russian books on aircraft engineering into Chinese. In 1954, he oversaw the manufacture of the Nanchang CJ-5 trainer aircraft, which was based on the Soviet Yakovlev Yak-18.

In August 1956, the Aviation Industry Bureau established the PRC's first airplane design office at Shenyang Aircraft Corporation, with Xu Shunshou as its director designer, Huang Zhiqian and Ye Zhengda as deputy directors. Xu led a team of 108 people, whose average age was only 22. Most team members were recent university graduates, and only three people: Xu, Huang, and Lu Xiaopeng, had any aircraft design experience.

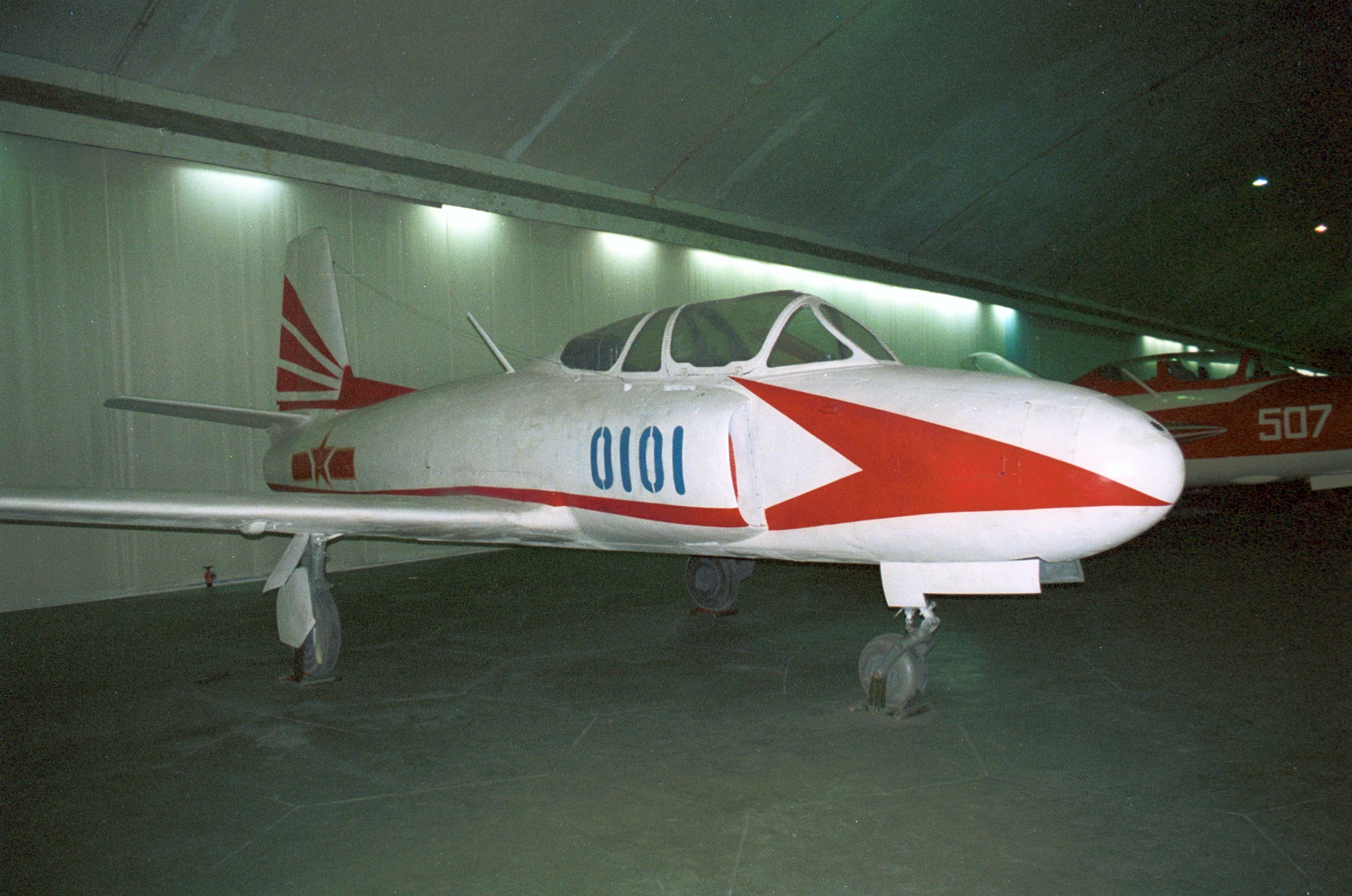
Shenyang JJ-1 jet trainer

The team's first task was to design a subsonic jet trainer, the Shenyang JJ-1. It was chosen because the PLA Air Force needed to train jet fighter pilots, and Shenyang Aircraft needed a relatively easy project to train its inexperienced designers. The project started in October 1956, and the plane took its maiden flight less than two years later, on 26 July 1958. According to GlobalSecurity.org, the development cycle was less than half that of similar planes designed in Japan and Czechoslovakia and the performance was superior.

The development of the JJ-1 marked a new era of China's aircraft manufacturing industry, and a number of Xu's team members, including Gu Songfen, Guan De, Tu Jida, Chen Yijian, and Feng Zhongyue (冯钟越), later became China's top aircraft designers. After the JJ-1, Xu participated in the design of the Nanchang CJ-6 trainer, the Nanchang Q-5 jet attack aircraft, and the Xian H-6 bomber. He also designed wind tunnels used for aircraft development.

In May 1964, Xu was abruptly transferred from Shenyang to the 603 Design Institute of the Xi'an Aircraft Company in Yanliang, Shaanxi. At the time, the 603 Institute had few technical experts and no well defined development goal. He designed an air conditioning system for the Ilyushin Il-28 bomber and its Chinese version, the Harbin H-5, but mainly focused on training engineers and translating and writing technical literature.

== Death and legacy ==
When the Cultural Revolution began in 1966, Xu was summoned back to Shenyang Aircraft in June, where he was denounced as a "capitalist academic authority". He was subject to almost a year of struggle sessions, although he still had time to read and translate technical documents. In April 1967, Xu received permission to return to the 603 Institute, and thought his ordeal was over. On the contrary, as the country descended into deeper chaos, he was labelled a "capitalist reactionary authority", "capitalist roader", and "anti-Communist spy". Soon after returning to Yanliang, he was imprisoned and repeatedly tortured. On 6 January 1968, after undergoing a final round of torture, he died at age 50.

Xu was politically rehabilitated after the end of the Cultural Revolution in 1976. The No. 1 Aircraft Research Institute (the former 603 Institute) erected a bronze statue of him on its campus in Yanliang, and established the "Xu Shunshou Science and Technology Progress Award" in his memory. On 19 May 2005, the first anniversary of the establishment of Tsinghua University School of Aerospace Engineering, a life-size marble statue of Xu was dedicated in the main building of the school. In 2008, the China Aviation Industry Press published Xu's biography, written by Shi Yuanguang and Xu's former trainee, academician Gu Songfen.

== Family ==
Xu was the youngest of five siblings. His brother, Xu Chi, was a famous writer known for his popular biographies of Chen Jingrun and Li Siguang. His third sister, Xu He (徐和), was the wife of Wu Xiuquan, who served as Vice Foreign Minister of China.

Xu married Song Shubi (宋蜀碧) in 1946, whom he had met four years before while working in Chengdu. She was a writer and translator known for her Chinese translation of Aylmer Maude's The Life of Tolstoy. The couple had three children. Their daughter, Xu Fan (徐汎), was an official of the World Tourism Organization of the United Nations. Their elder son, Xu Wen (徐汶), was still in middle school when Xu Shunshou died. He worked in a brick factory for eight years, and entered college after the Cultural Revolution and became an aerospace engineer. Their youngest son, Xu Yuan (徐源), became a tenured professor of mathematics at an American university.
