= Gu Songfen =

Chinese aircraft designer (1930–2026)

- 顾诵芬
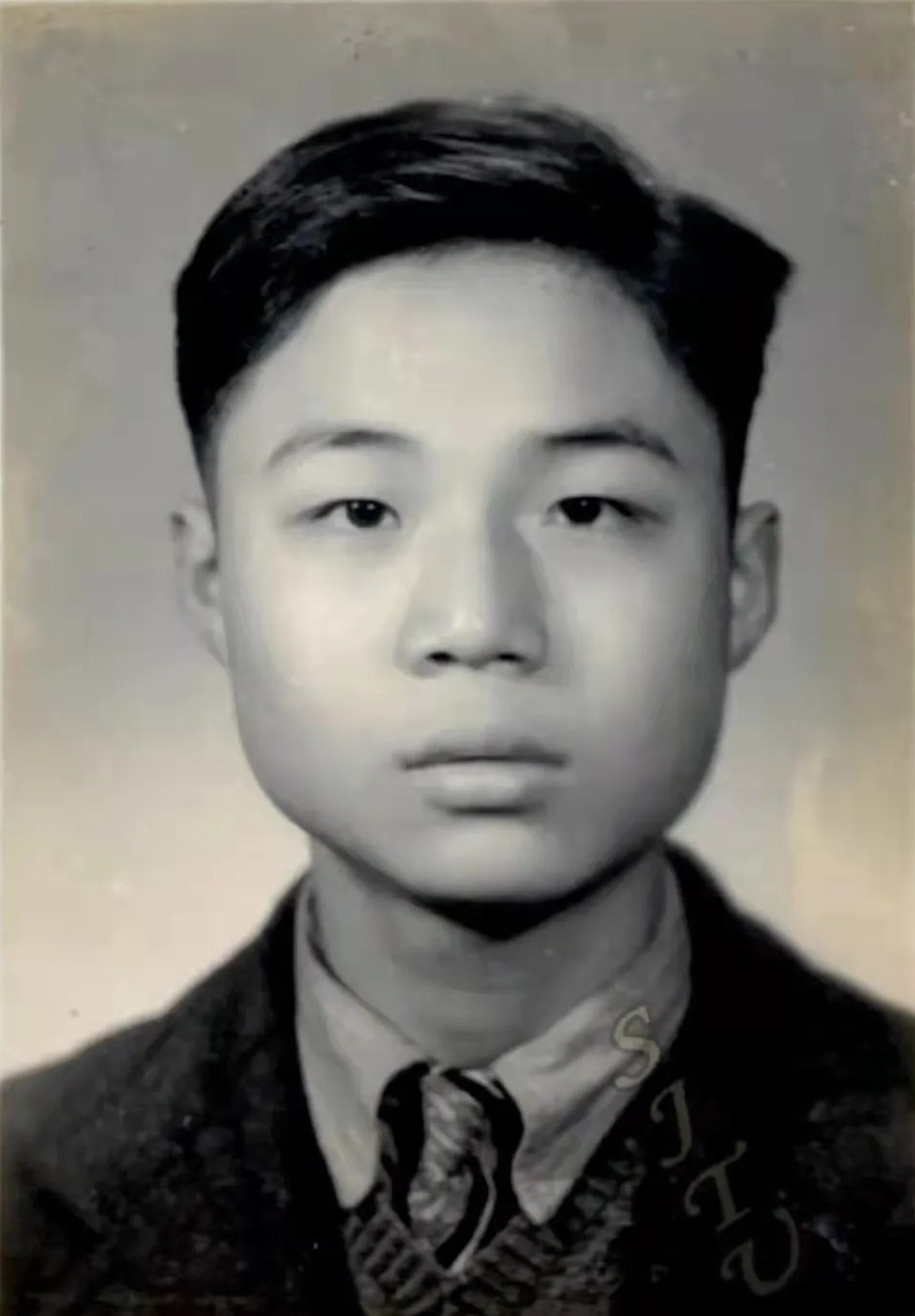
- Gu as a high school student at Nanyang Public School

Member of the Standing Committee of the 8th and 9th National People's Congress
- In office March 1993 – March 2003
- Chairman: Qiao Shi; Li Peng

Delegate to the 6th and 7th National People's Congress
- In office June 1983 – March 1993
- Chairman: Peng Zhen; Wan Li

Personal details
- Born: 4 February 1930 Suzhou, Jiangsu, People's Republic of China
- Died: 31 May 2026 (aged 96) Beijing, People's Republic of China
- Party: Chinese Communist Party
- Education: Chiao Tung University
- Scientific career
- Fields: Aircraft design
- Workplaces: Ministry of Astronautics Industry

Chinese name
- Simplified Chinese: 顾诵芬
- Traditional Chinese: 顧誦芬
Transcriptions
Standard Mandarin
- Hanyu Pinyin: Gù Sòngfēn

Gu Songfen (Chinese: 顾诵芬; 4 February 1930 – 31 May 2026) was a Chinese aircraft designer. He participated in the design of the Shenyang JJ-1, the People's Republic of China's first jet trainer. He was the chief designer of the Shenyang J-8 and J-8II, the PRC's first high-speed, high-altitude interceptor fighter jets. He served as vice president and chief designer of the Shenyang Aircraft Design Institute and was an academician of both the Chinese Academy of Sciences and the Chinese Academy of Engineering.

== Early life ==
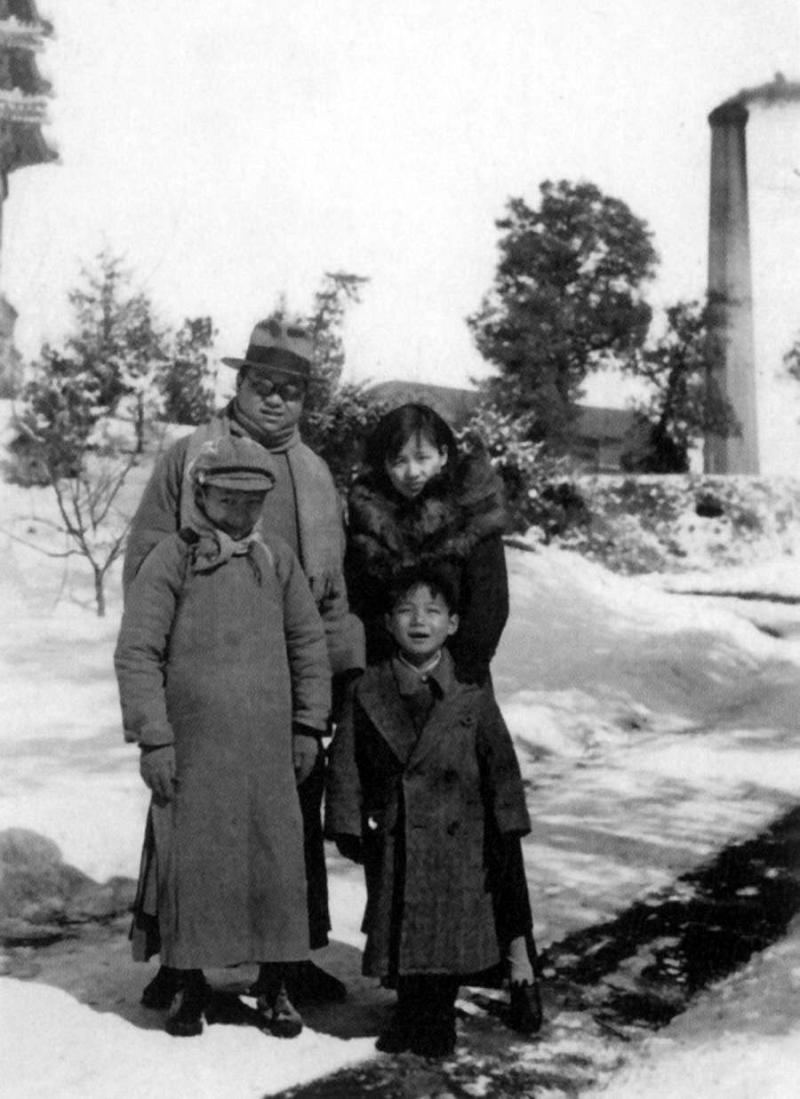
Gu Songfen (front right) with his parents and older brother at Yenching University, winter 1935

Gu was born 4 February 1930 in Suzhou, Jiangsu, China. He is the youngest son of Gu Tinglong (顾廷龙), a well known sinologist and calligrapher. His given name "Songfen" comes from a passage of the 3rd-century treatise Wen fu written by Lu Ji.

In 1935, Gu Tinglong accepted a job at the Yenching University library, and moved the family to Beijing. Two years later, the Second Sino-Japanese War broke out and Japanese warplanes bombed the Xiyuan Barracks of the Chinese 29th Army on 28 July 1937. As the Gu family lived near the barracks, their house was shaken by the explosions. Songfen recalled watching the bombs fall out of the planes, before adults urged him to hide under the dining table. He attributed to this experience as the main reason he decided to become an aircraft designer.

To escape Japanese occupation, in 1938 Gu Tinglong moved the family to the Shanghai French Concession, where he helped establish the United Library (合众图书馆). After the end of the war, Songfen graduated from high school in 1947 and entered National Chiao Tung University, Shanghai to study aeronautical engineering.

== Early career: the Shenyang JJ-1 ==
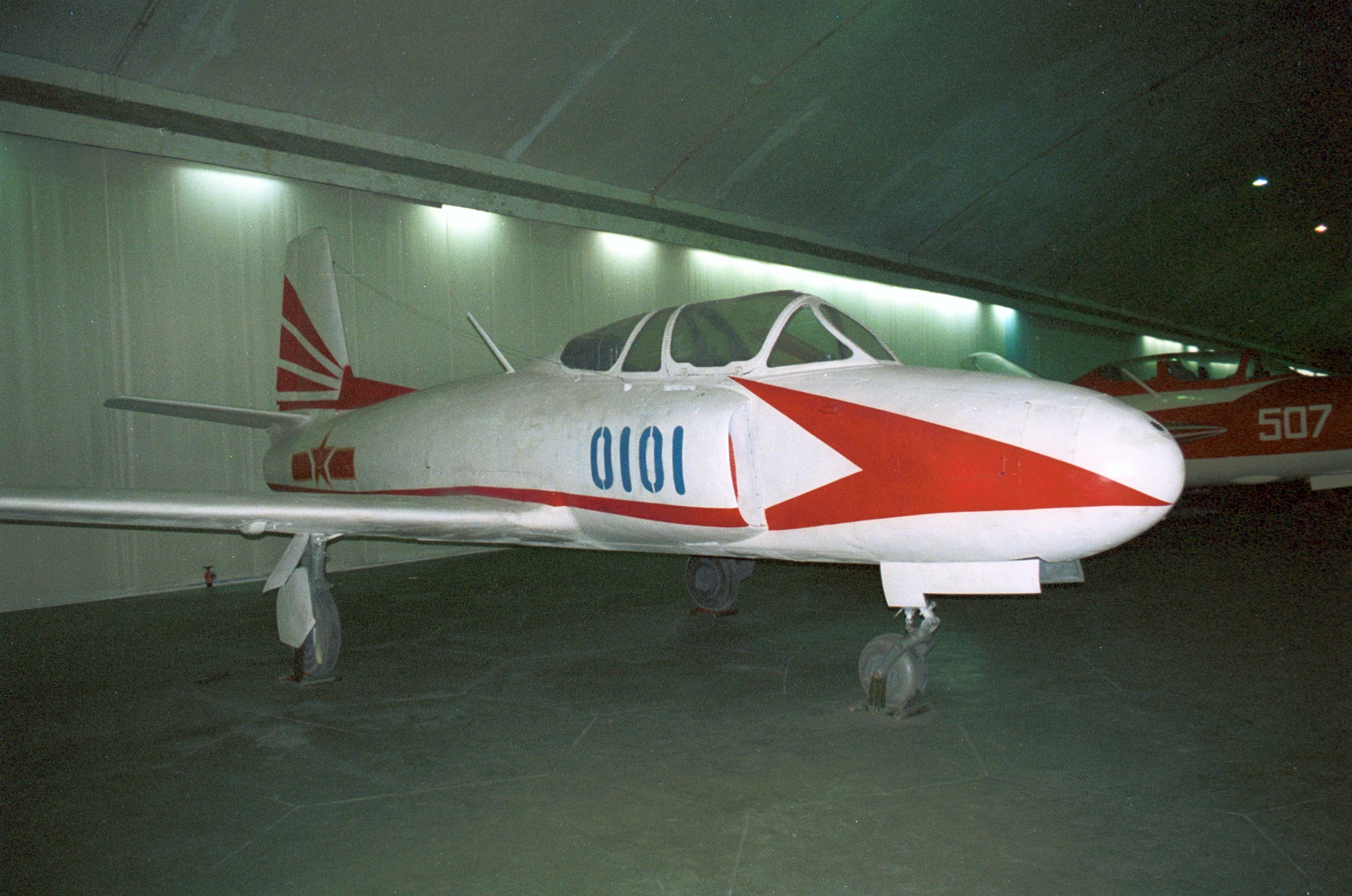
Shenyang JJ-1 jet trainer

Gu graduated from university in 1951, and was assigned to work for the newly established Aviation Industry Bureau of the Ministry of Heavy Industry, under the PRC's top aircraft designers Xu Shunshou and Huang Zhiqian. The People's Republic of China (PRC), which had just been founded two years earlier, was still establishing its aviation industry, and in the early years Gu mostly worked on servicing Soviet-made aircraft.

In August 1956, the Aviation Industry Bureau established the PRC's first airplane design office in Shenyang, with Xu Shunshou as its director, Huang Zhiqian and Ye Zhengda as deputy directors. Gu, then 26 years old, was appointed head of the aerodynamics group. The office's first task was to design and build a jet trainer, the Shenyang JJ-1. The plane took its first flight on 26 July 1958, which marked a new era for the PRC's aviation industry.

== Chief Designer of the Shenyang J-8 and J-8II ==
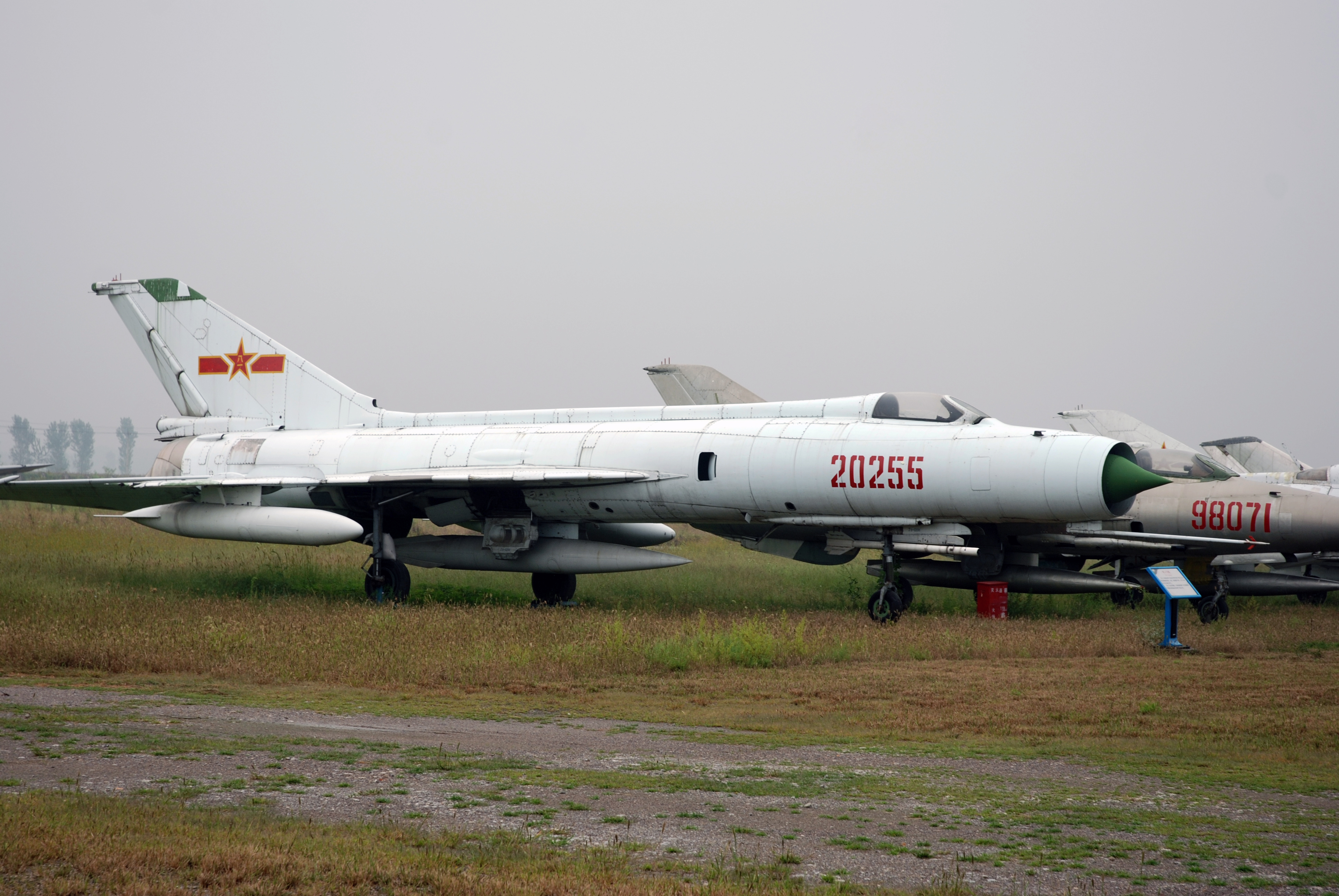
Shenyang J-8 interceptor

In October 1964, the PRC government decided to design and build its first high-speed, high-altitude interceptor fighter jet, later named the Shenyang J-8. Huang Zhiqian was appointed its chief designer, with Gu serving as his deputy. After Huang died in the Pakistan International Airlines Flight 705 crash in 1965, Gu succeeded him as chief designer. The project was delayed by the outbreak of the Cultural Revolution 1966, but the J-8 completed its maiden flight on 5 July 1969, which is considered another milestone in the development of the PRC's aviation industry. In November 1985, the J-8 project won the Special Prize of the State Science and Technology Progress Award, and Gu was named as the first recipient.

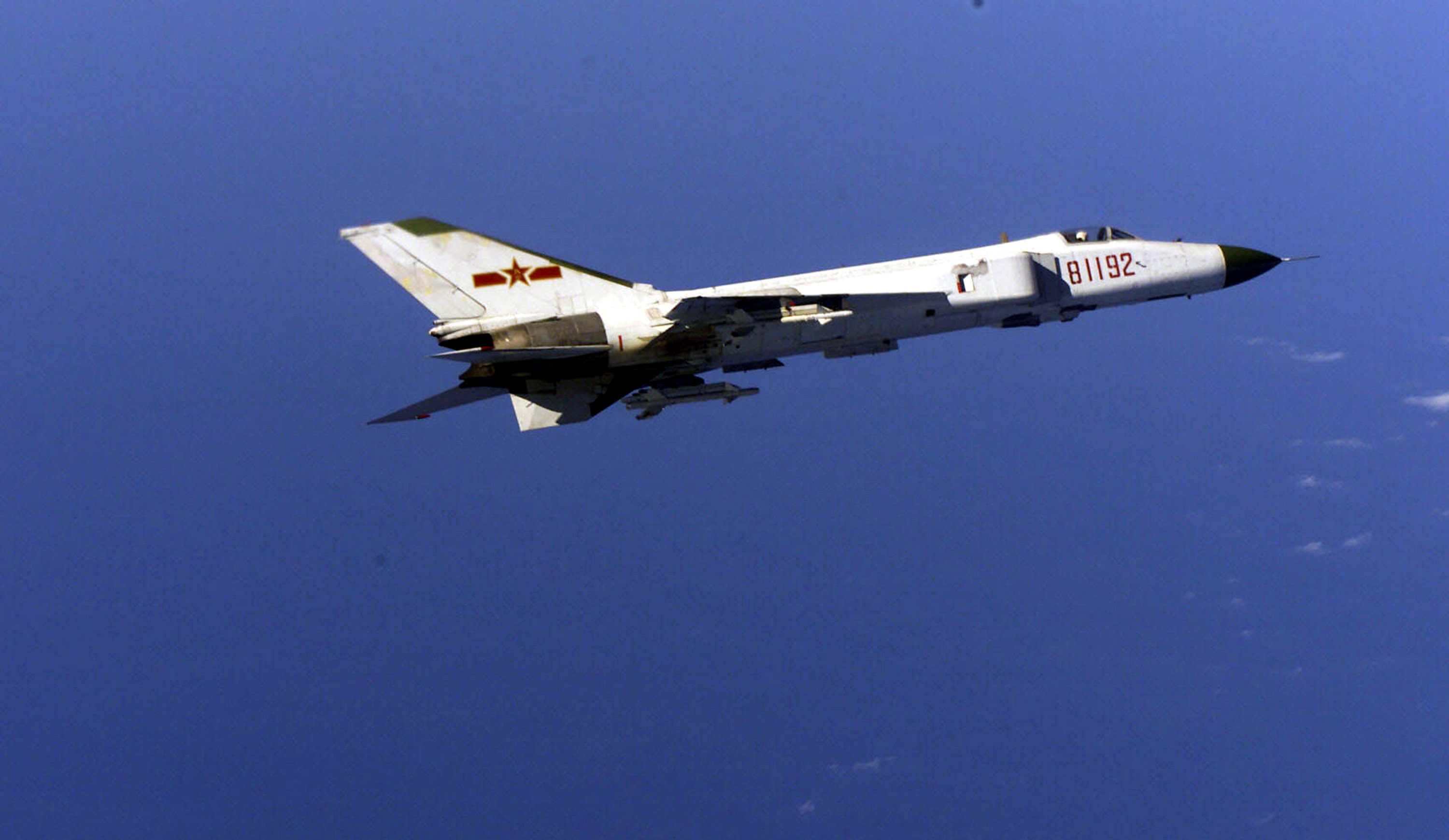
Shenyang J-8II interceptor

By 1977, Gu was chief designer and vice president of the Shenyang Aircraft Design Institute (then called the 601 Institute). In May 1981, Gu was appointed Chief Designer of the Shenyang J-8II, the next generation of the J-8 interceptor. The first J-8II plane completed its maiden flight on 12 June 1984, and its design was finalized in 1988. In 2000, the J-8II won the First Prize of the State Science and Technology Progress Award.

== Administrative career and honours ==
Gu was transferred to Beijing in 1986 to serve as Deputy Director of the national government's Aviation Industry and Technology Commission. In this capacity, he participated in planning the future development of the PRC's aviation industry. In June 2001, Gu, Wang Daheng, Shi Changxu, and more than a dozen other scientists proposed the development of the PRC's own jetliner. The proposal was adopted by the PRC government in 2007, and the Comac C919 took its maiden flight ten years later, on 5 May 2017.

He was elected an academician of the Chinese Academy of Sciences in 1991, and of the Chinese Academy of Engineering in 1994. Gu won the 1995 Ho Leung Ho Lee Prize for Science and Technology Progress. He was elected a delegate to the 7th, 8th, and 9th National People's Congress, and was a member of the Standing Committee of the 9th National People's Congress. In 2022, Gu became a laureate of the Asian Scientist 100 by the Asian Scientist.

== Death ==
Gu died on 31 May 2026, at the age of 96.
