= Xu Chi =

Chinese writer

Xu Chi (Chinese: 徐迟; 15 October 1914 – 22 December 1996) was a Chinese writer. A modernist poet and essayist in his early life, he later worked as a journalist and focused on reportage. He became widely known in China for his biographies of the mathematician Chen Jingrun (Goldbach's Conjecture) and the geologist Li Siguang (The Light of Geology). The Xu Chi Reportage Prize, China's highest award for reportage literature, was established in 2002 in his memory.

== Early life and career ==
Xu was born on 15 October 1914 in Nanxun, Zhejiang, Republic of China. His original name was Xu Shangshou (徐商寿). He chose the pen name Xu Chi (meaning "late") as he wanted to live an unhurried life, although he later said he did not succeed at that.

Xu studied at the School of Literature of Soochow University. He began composing poetry in 1931, and published his first works in 1934. When he was 22, he published his first poetry collection, A Twenty-Year-Old (二十岁人). His early poetry was influenced by Western literary modernism. Starting in 1936, he wrote essays, which were later published in two collections. They were influenced by Ernest Hemingway.

== Early People's Republic of China ==
After the founding of the People's Republic of China in 1949, Xu worked as a journalist for the People's Daily. He visited the battlefield of the Korean War twice and the construction sites of Anshan Steel and the Nanjing Yangtze River Bridge multiple times. He published a number of poetry and essay collections in this period, including War, Peace, Progress and Songs of the Republic. From 1957 to 1960, he served as deputy editor-in-chief of Shi Kan (诗刊), China's foremost poetry journal.

In 1960, Xu settled in Wuhan and began to focus on reportage. He published several books in this period, including Under the Qilian Mountains (祁连山下), about the art scholar Chang Shuhong and the geologist Sun Jianchu (孙健初).

== After the Cultural Revolution ==
After the end of the Cultural Revolution (1966–1976), during which numerous intellectuals and scientists were persecuted and murdered by Red Guards, Xu wrote The Light of Geology (地质之光), highlighting the contributions of the geologist Li Siguang. Soon afterward, he wrote Goldbach's Conjecture (哥德巴赫猜想), a biography of the mathematician Chen Jingrun, who had proved Chen's theorem despite being persecuted during the Cultural Revolution. First published in People's Literature in January 1978, it was reprinted in the People's Daily a month later and became a national sensation. Chen Jingrun became a household name in China and received a sackful of love letters from all over the country within two months.

Xu was awarded the National Reportage Literature Prize three times, for The Light of Geology, Goldbach's Conjecture, and Xingtian Wu Ganqi (刑天舞干戚), about the construction of the Gezhouba Dam.

== Personal life ==
Xu had three older sisters and a younger brother. His brother, Xu Shunshou, was a founder of China's aircraft manufacturing industry. His sister Xu He (徐和) married Wu Xiuquan, who served as Vice Foreign Minister of China. Three of his siblings, including Xu Shunshou and the two other sisters, died in the Cultural Revolution.

Xu married Chen Song (陈松) in Shanghai on January 1, 1936. They had three children. After the death of Chen Song, Xu married Chen Binbin (陈彬彬), but they soon divorced. The actress Bai Ling is Chen Binbin's daughter from a previous marriage.

== Death and legacy ==
After his divorce, Xu lived alone in Wuhan and suffered from poor health. On 22 December 1996, he jumped to his death from his hospital room, aged 82.

In 2002, the China Reportage Literature Association and the government of Huzhou city established the Xu Chi Reportage Prize, which is considered China's highest prize in the field. It is awarded every two years in Nanxun, Xu's hometown.
