= CJ-6 =

CJ-6 or CJ6 may refer to:

- Jeep CJ-6 land transport vehicle
- Nanchang CJ-6 aircraft
- China railway CJ6, electric multiple unit produced by CRRC
