= Lu Xiaopeng =

Chinese aircraft designer

Lu Xiaopeng (Chinese: 陆孝彭; Wade–Giles: Lu Hsiao-p'eng; 19 August 1920 – 16 October 2000) was a Chinese aircraft designer who spent most of his career at Hongdu Aviation (formerly Nanchang Aircraft). He was the chief designer of the Nanchang Q-5 supersonic attack aircraft, one of the most widely deployed aircraft of the PLA Air Force. He also designed the Nanchang J-12, the world's lightest supersonic fighter, which however never entered service. He was an academician of the Chinese Academy of Engineering.

== Early life and career ==
Lu was born on 19 August 1920 in Shanghai, Republic of China, with his ancestral home in Changzhou, Jiangsu. He studied at the Jiangsu Provincial High School from 1935 to 1937, and then entered the National Central University to study aeronautical engineering. After the Second Sino-Japanese War broke out in 1937, the university was exiled in Chongqing, China's wartime capital, and he graduated in 1941.

In 1942, he received further training at the Republic of China Air Force's mechanics school in Chengdu. A year later, he was assigned to work for the No. 2 Aircraft Manufacturing Factory in Nanchuan, Chongqing, as an aircraft designer. In December 1944, he was sent to the United States to work at the McDonnell Aircraft Corporation, where he participated in the design of shipborne jet fighters. He was then sent to Britain to work as a designer at the Gloster Aircraft Company.

== Early PRC and the Shenyang JJ-1 ==
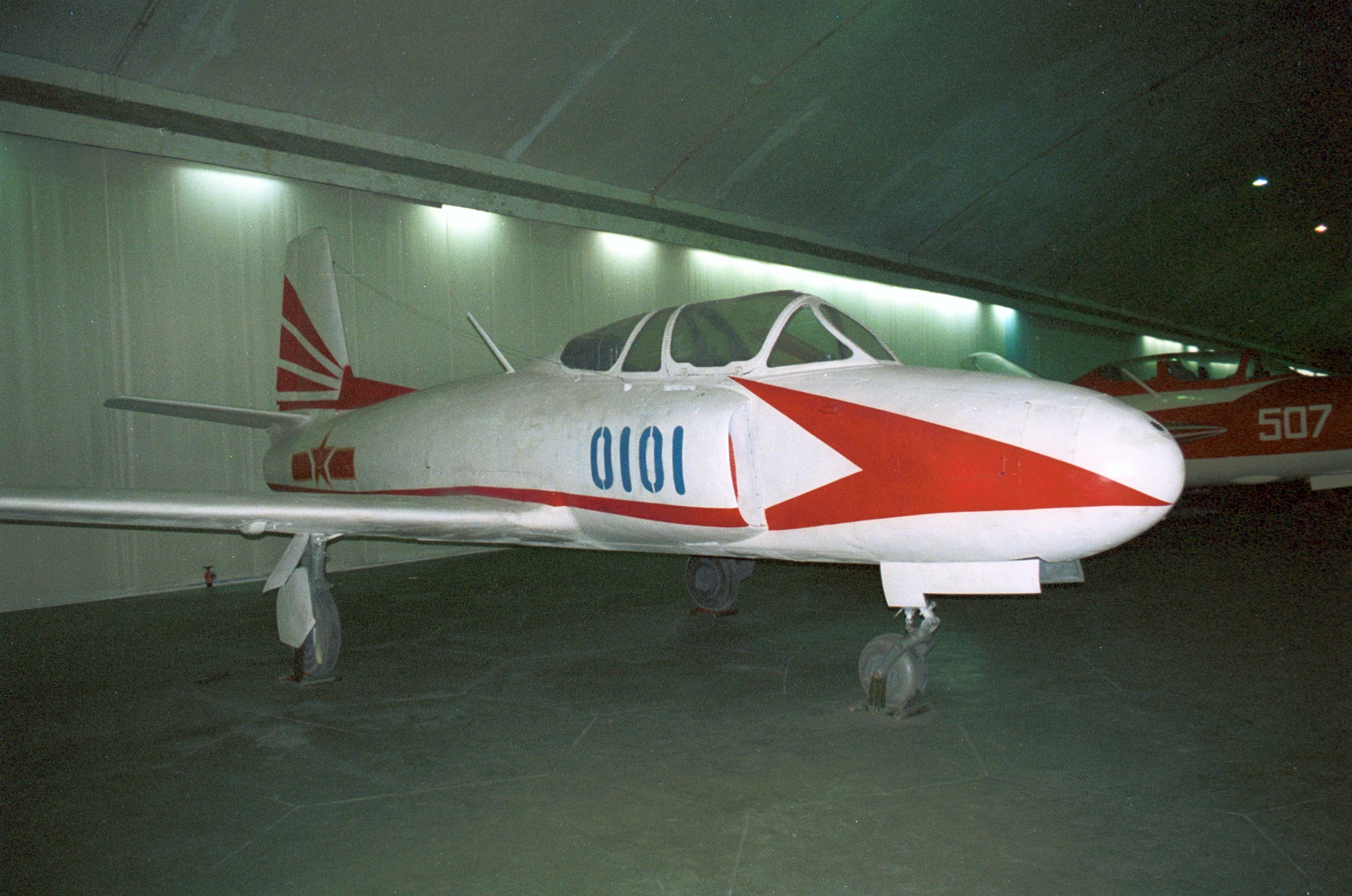
A Shenyang JJ-1 jet trainer

In August 1949, just before the establishment of the People's Republic of China, Lu returned to China via Hong Kong to work for the new government. From 1949 to 1951, Lu worked on constructing airports in the East China Military Region. After the Korean War broke out, Lu was transferred to Beijing Nanyuan Airport to service military and transport aircraft in support of the war effort.

In 1956, he was transferred to the aircraft design office of Shenyang Aircraft Factory (112 Factory), working under director Xu Shunshou. He was one of the main designers of the Shenyang JJ-1 trainer, the first jet aircraft designed in China. Besides Xu Shushou and deputy director Huang Zhiqian, Lu was the only person in the development team who had had aircraft design experience. The project began in October 1956, and the plane took its maiden flight less than two years later, on 26 July 1958. The development cycle was less than half that of similar planes designed in Japan and Czechoslovakia and the performance was superior.

== Designing the Nanchang Q-5 attack aircraft ==
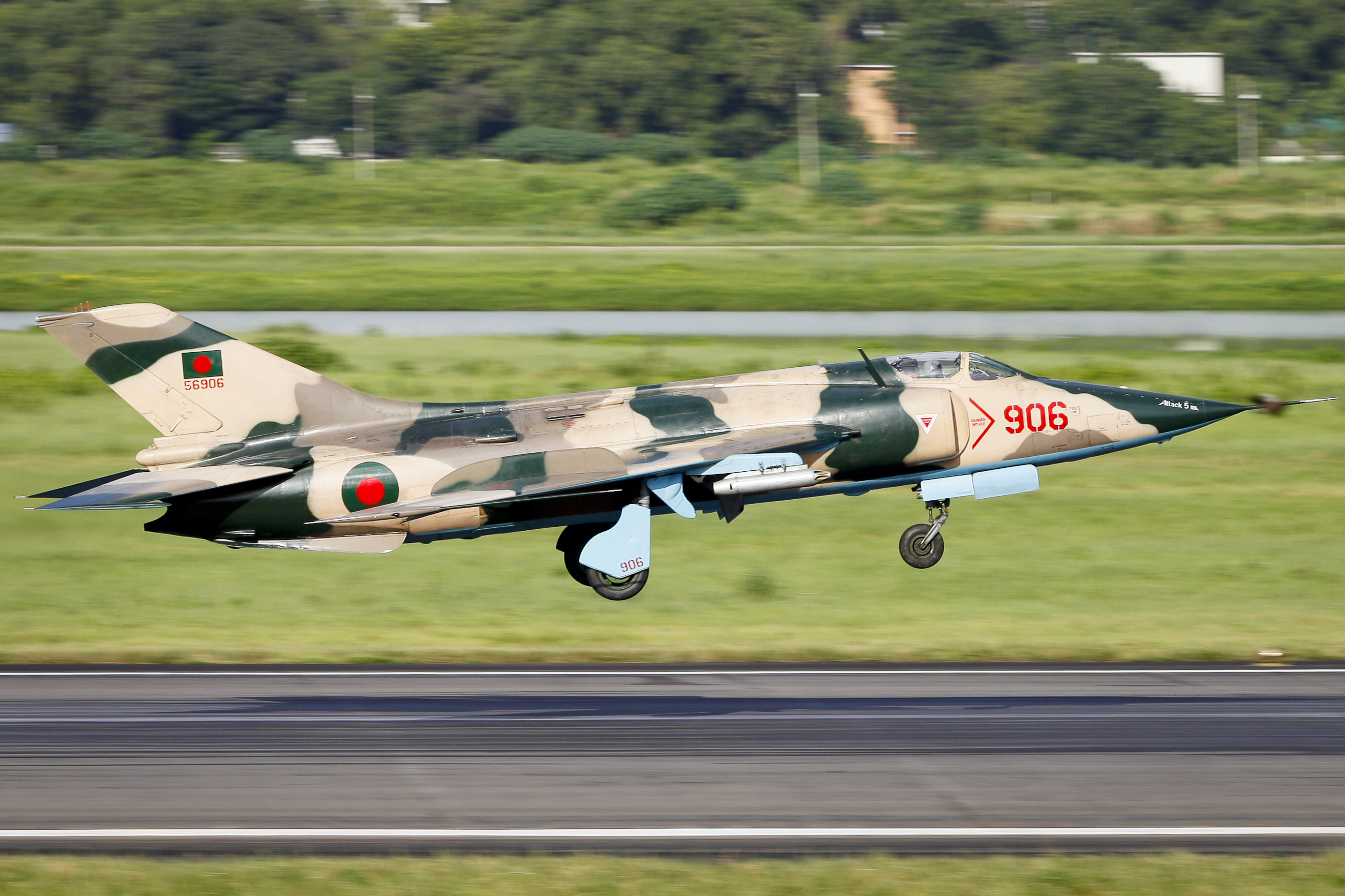
A Nanchang A-5 (Q-5) of the Bangladesh Air Force

In 1958, Lu was transferred to the Hongdu Aircraft Factory (320 Factory) in Nanchang, and appointed chief designer of the Nanchang Q-5 supersonic attack aircraft. However, because of economic difficulties during the Great Leap Forward, the Chinese government decided to cancel the project in August 1961. Lu petitioned the government to save the project, and was allowed to continue his research, but his staff was reduced from more than 100 members to just 14.

With his skeleton crew, Lu spent two years to build a stationary prototype aircraft. This achievement caught the attention of Minister Sun Zhiyuan (孙志远) of the Third Ministry of Machine Building and Cao Lihuai (曹里怀), Deputy Commander of the PLA Air Force. They ordered a full resumption of the project, and the Q-5 completed its maiden flight on 4 June 1965. After further testing and improvement, the Q-5 was mass produced in 1968 to equip the Air Force. It was China's first self-designed attack aircraft that was mass produced and widely deployed. In January 1972, a modified Q-5 aircraft (Q5-A) was used to conduct a hydrogen bomb test at Lop Nur.

In 1981, Lu was again named chief designer for updating the Q-5 with an improved range. The redesigned Q-5, with seven different models, became one of the most widely used aircraft in the Chinese Air Force. It was also exported to foreign countries. In 1985, the Q-5 project won the Special Prize of the State Science and Technology Progress Award.

== Designing the Nanchang J-12 fighter ==
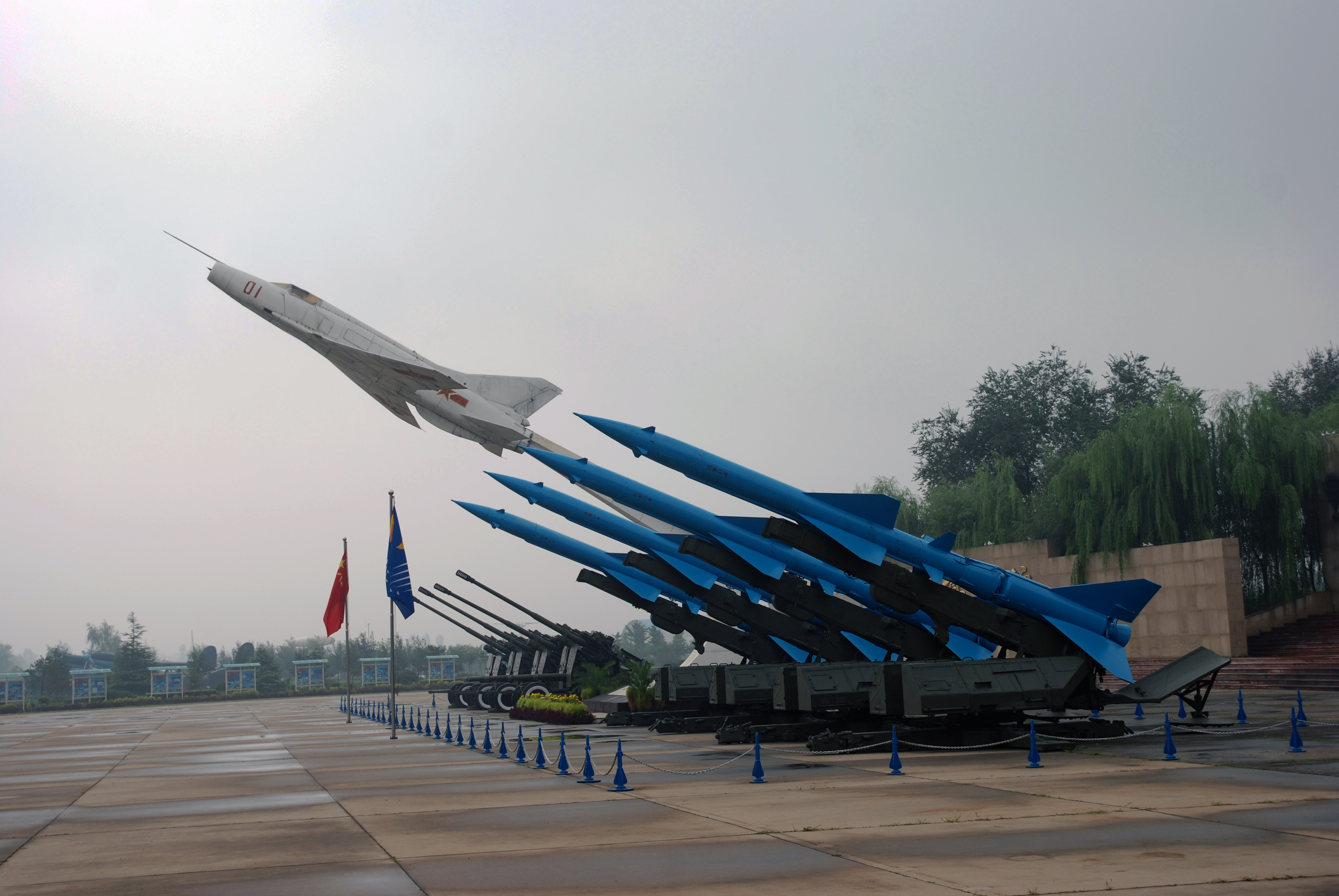
A Nanchang J-12 on display at the Chinese Aviation Museum

In the 1967 Six-Day War between Israel and Arab countries, the Soviet-made aircraft performed poorly, and the PLA Air Force wanted a new lightweight fighter to replace its Shenyang J-6, which was the Chinese-made version of the Soviet MiG 19. In 1969, Lu was tasked with designing the Nanchang J-12 supersonic fighter. Only 17 months later, the aircraft took its first flight on 26 December 1970. The J-12 was the first fighter jet completely designed with Chinese technology and not modelled after a Soviet aircraft. It was also the lightest supersonic fighter in the world, with exceptional dexterity and evasion ability. However, its light weight also proved to be a weakness, as the limited space for missiles and fuel and the lack of a radar meant it had poor range and combat capabilities. As a result, the J-12 never entered service, but it laid a solid foundation for the future development of fighters.

== Other contributions and awards ==
In addition to designing aircraft, Lu conducted theoretical research on aerodynamics. He wrote a textbook on aircraft design in 1974, and a 400,000-word research report on fourth-generation lightweight fighters. In 1991, he was awarded the Aviation Gold Medal, the highest award in China's aviation industry. He was elected an academician of the Chinese Academy of Engineering in 1995.

Lu died on 16 October 2000, at the age of 80.
