= Wu Xiuquan =

Chinese military officer and diplomat (1908–1997)

- 伍修权
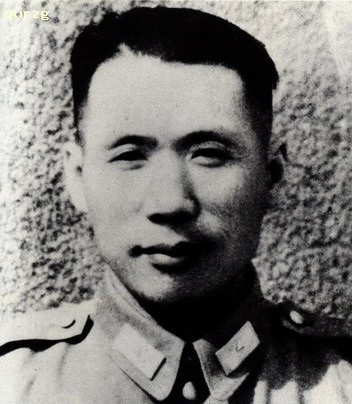
- Wu in 1946

Chinese Ambassador to Yugoslavia
- In office 26 February 1955 – 1 September 1958
- Preceded by: Position established
- Succeeded by: Chargé d'affaires

Personal details
- Born: 6 March 1908 Wuchang, Hubei, Qing China
- Died: 3 November 1997 (aged 89) Beijing, China
- Party: Chinese Communist Party
- Spouse: Xu He
- Education: Moscow Sun Yat-sen University

Military service
- Allegiance: China
- Branch/service: Eighth Route Army
- Rank: Major General
- Commands: Shenyang Military Control Commission; Northeast Military Region Staff; Changchun Branch, Military Mediation Office; First Bureau, General Staff, Central Military Commission; Lanzhou Office, Eighth Route Army; 73rd Division Staff, 15th Red Army

Wu Xiuquan
- Traditional Chinese: 伍修權
- Simplified Chinese: 伍修权
Transcriptions
Standard Mandarin
- Hanyu Pinyin: Wǔ Xiūquán
- Wade–Giles: Wu^{3} Hsiu^{1}-ch'üan^{2}
- IPA: [ù ɕjóʊ.tɕʰwǎn]

Wu Xiuquan (Chinese: 伍修权; Wade–Giles: Wu Hsiu-ch'üan; 6 March 1908 – 9 November 1997) was a Chinese Communist revolutionary, military officer, and diplomat. He studied in the Soviet Union, enlisted in the Chinese Red Army, and participated in the Long March. After the founding of the People's Republic of China, he served as Vice Minister of Foreign Affairs, China's first ambassador to Yugoslavia, and Vice Minister of the International Department of the Chinese Communist Party. After being imprisoned for eight years during the Cultural Revolution, Wu was appointed Deputy Chief of the People's Liberation Army General Staff Department in 1975 and later served as vice president of the special court that tried and convicted the Gang of Four and the Lin Biao clique of numerous crimes during the Cultural Revolution.

== Early life and education ==
Wu was born on 6 March 1908 in Wuchang, Hubei, toward the end of the Qing dynasty, with his ancestral home in Yangxin County. While studying at Wuhan Middle School, he was active in the student movement and became a member of the Socialist Youth League of China under the influence of Chen Tanqiu and Dong Biwu.

In October 1925, he was sent to the Soviet Union to study international politics at Moscow Sun Yat-sen University. After the 1927 Shanghai massacre, the Chinese Communist Party established its own military force, and Wu was transferred to Moscow Infantry School to receive military training. He worked in the Russian Far East after 1929.

== Wartime career ==
Wu returned to China in May 1931, when the Communist movement was at its nadir. He enlisted in the Red Army and participated in the Long March. At the crucial Zunyi Conference in 1935, Wu served as the interpreter for the Comintern advisor Otto Braun (Li De), but opposed Braun and supported Mao Zedong's strategy, unlike other returnees from the Soviet Union who supported the Comintern's orthodox line.

During the Second Sino-Japanese War, Wu was appointed Director of the Eighth Route Army's Lanzhou Office, which he developed into a hub for receiving and transporting military aid from the Soviet Union for China's war effort. Thus, he was granted the rank of Colonel. It was here, in late 1938, that Wu received Nguyễn Ái Quốc, the future political leader of North Vietnam. After the surrender of Japan at the end the war, Wu was appointed Chief of Staff of the People's Liberation Army (PLA) in the formerly Japanese-occupied Northeast China. In September 1945, to facilitate negotiations with the Soviet Army regarding the takeover of Northeast China, Wu Xiuquan was awarded the rank of Major General, becoming one of a few Chinese Communist officials to receive a military rank before the founding of the People's Republic. In June 1946, he served as the head of the Chinese side of the Changchun Branch, Military Mediation Office, engaging in a tit-for-tat struggle with representatives of the Kuomintang and the United States. He became Chairman of the Shenyang Military Control Commission after the PLA seized the city in November 1948, and a member of the Northeast People's Government when it was founded in August 1949.

He also served as a member of the Northeast Bureau of the CPC Central Committee, Second Chief of Staff of the Northeast Democratic Allied Army, and the Principal of the Northeast Military Region Military and Political School, participating in the establishment of the PLA's first aviation and naval schools. During Mao Zedong's visit to the Soviet Union in 1949, he was responsible for security during Mao's transit through Northeast China, which was his last task as Chief of Staff of the Northeast Military Region.

== Early People's Republic of China ==
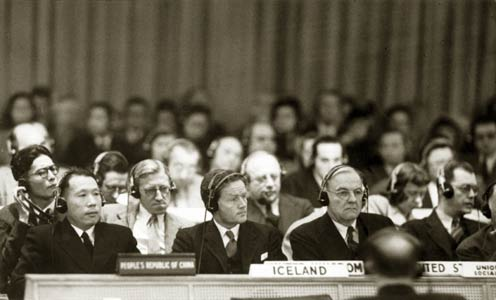
Wu Xiuquan (left) at the United Nations, 1950

When the People's Republic of China was founded in October 1949, Wu was appointed head of the Soviet Union and Eastern Europe Department of the Foreign Ministry and accompanied Mao Zedong on his visit to the Soviet Union in January 1950. In November 1950, Wu attended a United Nations Security Council meeting as the PRC representative. He made a long speech condemning the United States for its "armed aggression" in Taiwan and "armed intervention" in the Korean War, and called for the UN to demand the withdrawal of U.S. forces from both Taiwan and Korea.

In 1951, Wu was promoted to Vice Foreign Minister of the PRC. In March 1953, he visited Moscow again, as a member of the Chinese delegation led by Premier Zhou Enlai, to attend the funeral of Joseph Stalin.

In September 1954, Wu was elected a member of the Sichuan delegation to the 1st National People's Congress. In March 1955, he was appointed the PRC's first ambassador to Yugoslavia. He was elected a member of the 8th Central Committee of the Chinese Communist Party in 1956. In 1958, he attended the Seventh Congress of Yugoslavian Communist Party, after which Sino-Yugoslavian relations almost broke because China harshly criticized Yugoslavia for its disobedience against Soviet Union. From October 1958 to April 1967, he served as Vice Minister of the International Department of the Chinese Communist Party. In December 1962 and January 1963, Wu visited Bulgaria, Hungary, Czechoslovakia and East Germany to attend each country's party congresses, the last of which attended by Khrushchev. Wu exchanged fierce remarks with local communists and meanwhile, the Sino-Soviet dispute worsened.

== Cultural Revolution and aftermath ==
During the Cultural Revolution, Wu resisted Kang Sheng's attempt to persecute the senior leader Wang Jiaxiang. On 8 April 1967, after he posted a big-character poster condemning the chaos created by the radicals at the International Liaison Department, Kang Sheng and Lin Biao arrested Wu as a foreign spy and imprisoned him for eight years.

In April 1975, Marshal Ye Jianying worked to rehabilitate Wu and appointed him Deputy Chief of the PLA General Staff Department. After the end of the Cultural Revolution, Wu was appointed vice president of the special court for the trials of the Gang of Four and the Lin Biao clique. He presided over 16 trials and participated in 14 others. He was elected a member of the 11th Central Committee and a standing committee member of the 12th and 13th Central Advisory Commission. He was also a member of the Standing Committee of the National People's Congress and the Chinese People's Political Consultative Conference.

In October 1979, Wu became the founding chairman of the newly established Beijing Institute for International Strategic Studies, which in October 1992 was renamed the China Institute for International Strategic Studies (CIISS).

Wu published several memoirs, including My Life's Journey, Reminiscences of Wu Xiuquan, and Eight Years in the Ministry of Foreign Affairs.

On 9 November 1997, Wu died in Beijing at the age of 89.

== Family ==
Wu had four daughters and a son with his first wife. After her death, Wu married Xu He (徐和) in 1948 in Dalian, and she gave birth to another daughter. Xu He was the third of five children of the educator Xu Yibing. Xu Chi, a renowned writer, and Xu Shunshou, a founder of China's aircraft manufacturing industry, were Wu's brothers-in-law.
