= Nanchang CJ-6 =

Chinese aircraft

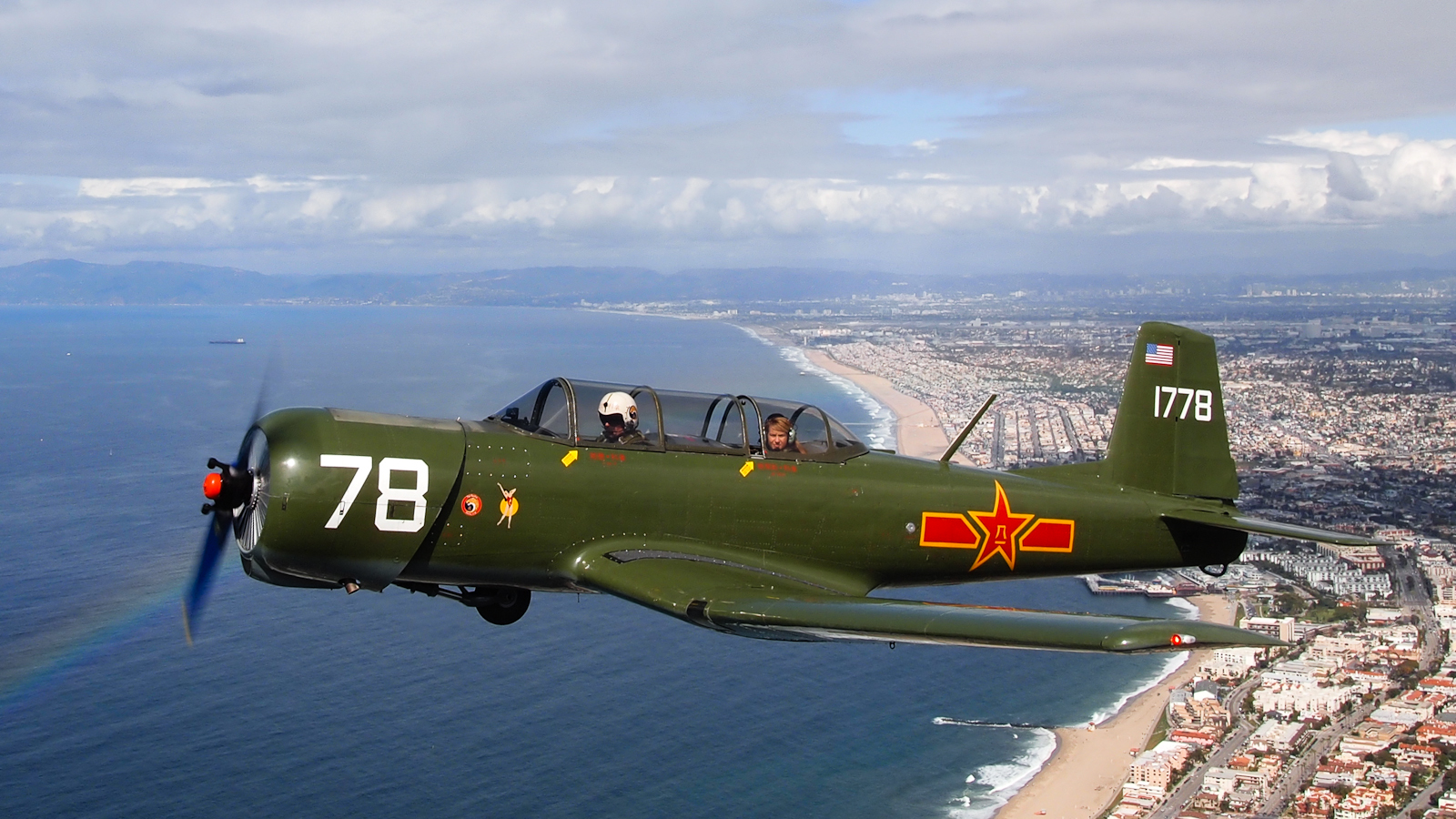
- A Nanchang CJ-6A

General information
- Type: Basic Trainer
- Manufacturer: Nanchang Aircraft Factory (Hongdu)
- Status: In service
- Primary users: People's Liberation Army Air Force Korean People's Army Air Force; Bangladesh Air Force; Sudanese Air Force
- Number built: 2,000+

History
- Manufactured: 1958-present
- Introduction date: 1960
- First flight: August 27, 1958

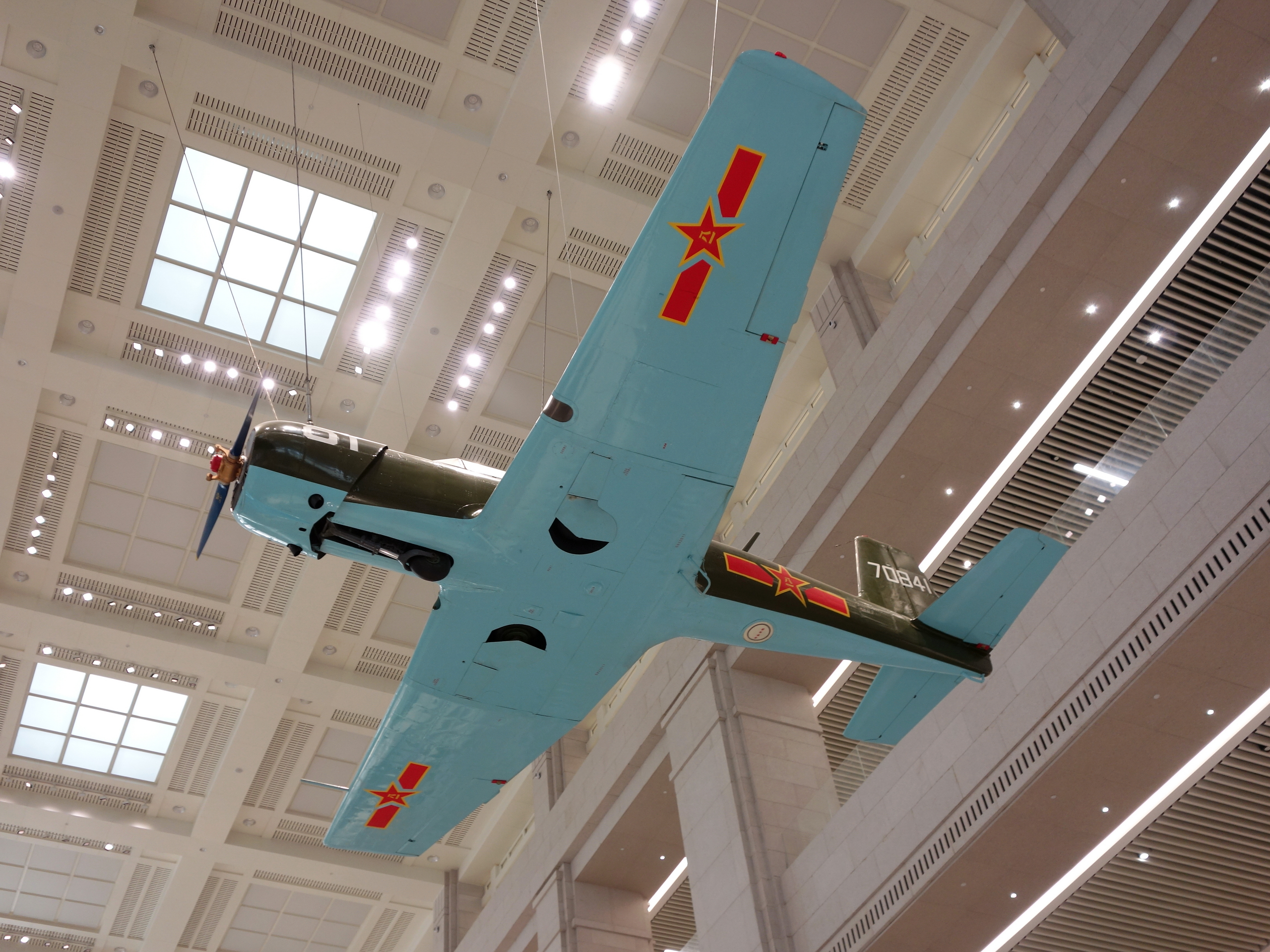
Nanchang CJ-6 in Military Museum of the Chinese People's Revolution

The Nanchang CJ-6 (Chinese: 初教6) is a Chinese basic trainer aircraft designed and built by the Nanchang Aircraft Factory (now Hongdu Aviation) for use by the People's Liberation Army Air Force (PLAAF).

== Development ==
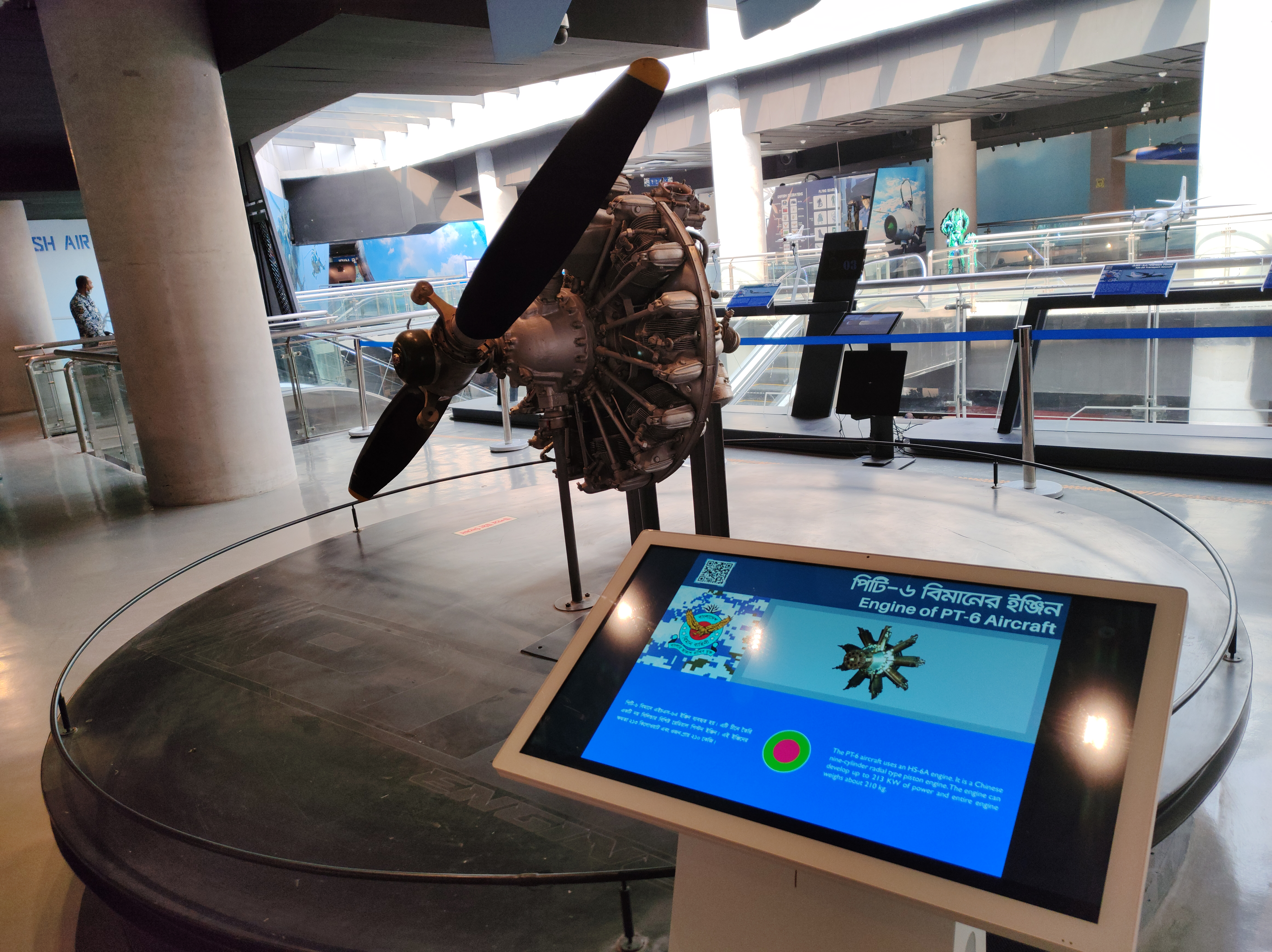
Zhouzhou HS-6A radial engine from BAF PT-6A (export version of CJ-6) on display at Bangladesh Military Museum

The CJ-6 (Chu Jiao 初教 = Chuji Jiaolianji 初级教练机 = basic trainer aircraft) is an all-original Chinese design that is commonly mistaken for a Yak-18A. Its predecessor, the Nanchang CJ-5, was a licence-built version of the Yak-18. However, advancements in pilot training brought a need for a new aircraft with improved performance and a tricycle landing gear. When the Soviet Union developed the Yak-18A, PLAAF engineers decided that its performance and design would not suit China's needs.

The aircraft was designed in 1958 by the Nanchang Aircraft Factory (now Hongdu Aviation). As the Shenyang Aircraft Factory already had experience building the Shenyang JJ-1 begun technical research for the CJ-6, more than 20 Shenyang designers were transferred to Nanchang, including chief designers Tu Jida and Lin Jiahua. Xu Shunshou and Huang Zhiqian, then China's top aircraft designers, were also involved.

During late 1957 Aeronautical Engineers Cheng Bushi and Lin Jiahua began work in Shenyang on a trainer design that addressed the shortcomings of the Yak-18A. The design they delivered featured an aluminum semi-monocoque fuselage, flush-riveted throughout, and introduced a modified Clark airfoil wing design with pronounced dihedral in the outer sections. The dihedral and an angular vertical tail distinguish it externally from the otherwise vaguely similar Yak-18A. Wind tunnel testing validated the design, and in May 1958 the program was transferred to the Nanchang Aircraft Manufacturing factory where Chief Engineer Gao Zhenning initiated production of the CJ-6. The first flight of the CJ-6 was completed on August 27, 1958, by Lu Maofan and He Yinxi.

Power for the prototype was provided by a Czech-built horizontally opposed piston engine, but flight testing revealed the need for more power, so a locally manufactured version of the Soviet AI-14P 260 hp radial, the Huosai HS-6 (Chinese: 活塞-6), was substituted along with a matching propeller, and with that change the CJ-6 was approved for mass production. In 1965 the HS-6 engine was upgraded to 285 hp and redesignated the HS-6A, and the aircraft equipped with the new power plant were designated the CJ-6A.

A total production run estimated at more than 3,000 aircraft supplied CJ-6 aircraft for PLAAF training, as well as for export (as the PT-6) to countries including Albania, Bangladesh, Cambodia, North Korea, Tanzania, and Sri Lanka.

It is expected the CJ-7 Trainer (L-7) primary trainer jointly developed by Hongdu and Yakovlev will replace the CJ-6s in the PLAAF.

CJ-6 attained its civil aviation type certificate on February 28, 2019, more than 60 years after it entered military service in China.

== General information ==
One thing to note is that the Nanchang CJ-6 makes extensive use of pneumatics to control the gear and flap extension/retraction, operate the brakes and start the engine. An engine-driven air pump recharges the system; however if air pressure is too low to start the engine then the onboard air tank can be recharged by an external source. If an external source is not available then the engine can be started by hand swinging the propeller.

== Variants ==
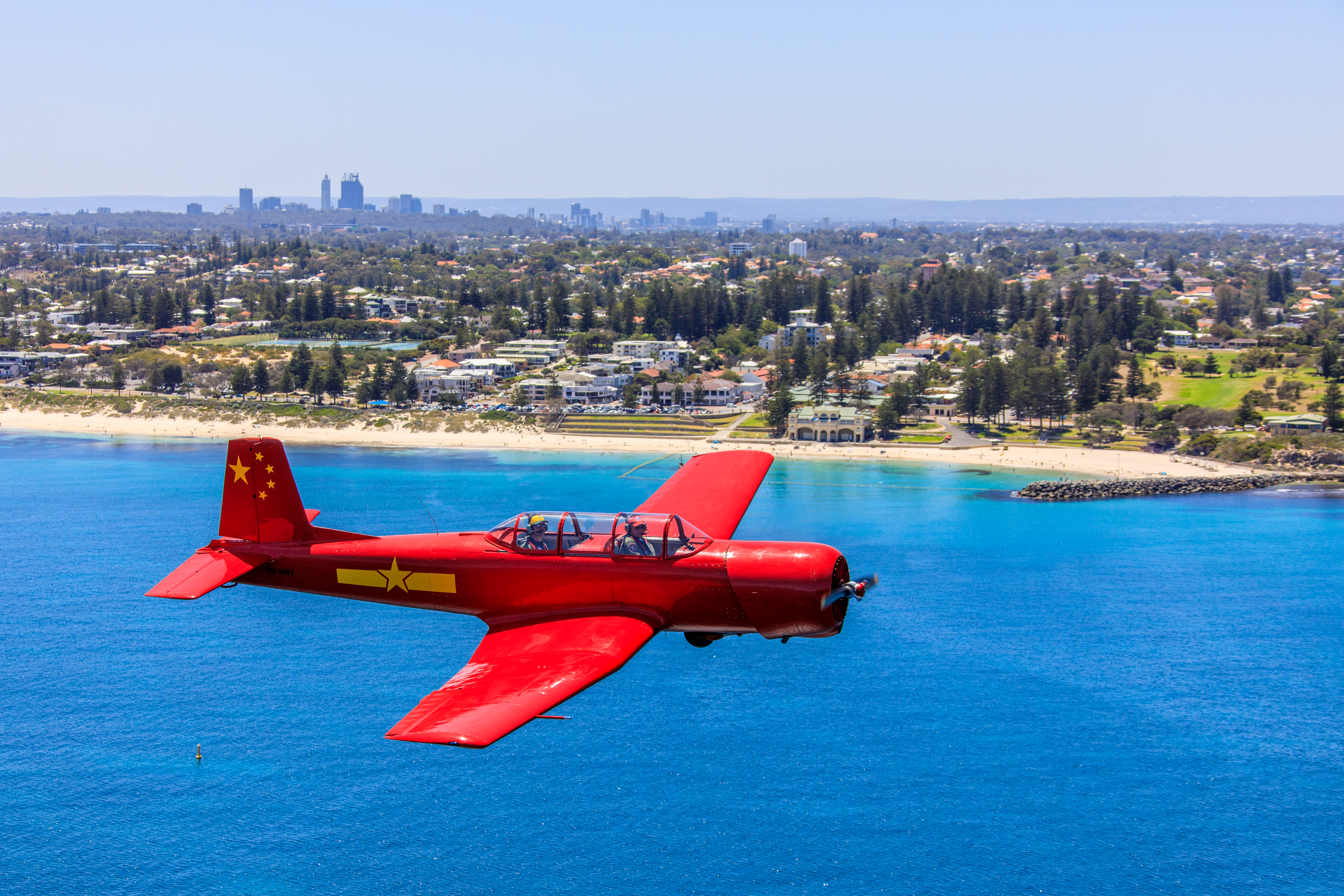
A restored and repainted Nanchang CJ-6 is flown in adventure flights off the coast of Perth, Western Australia.

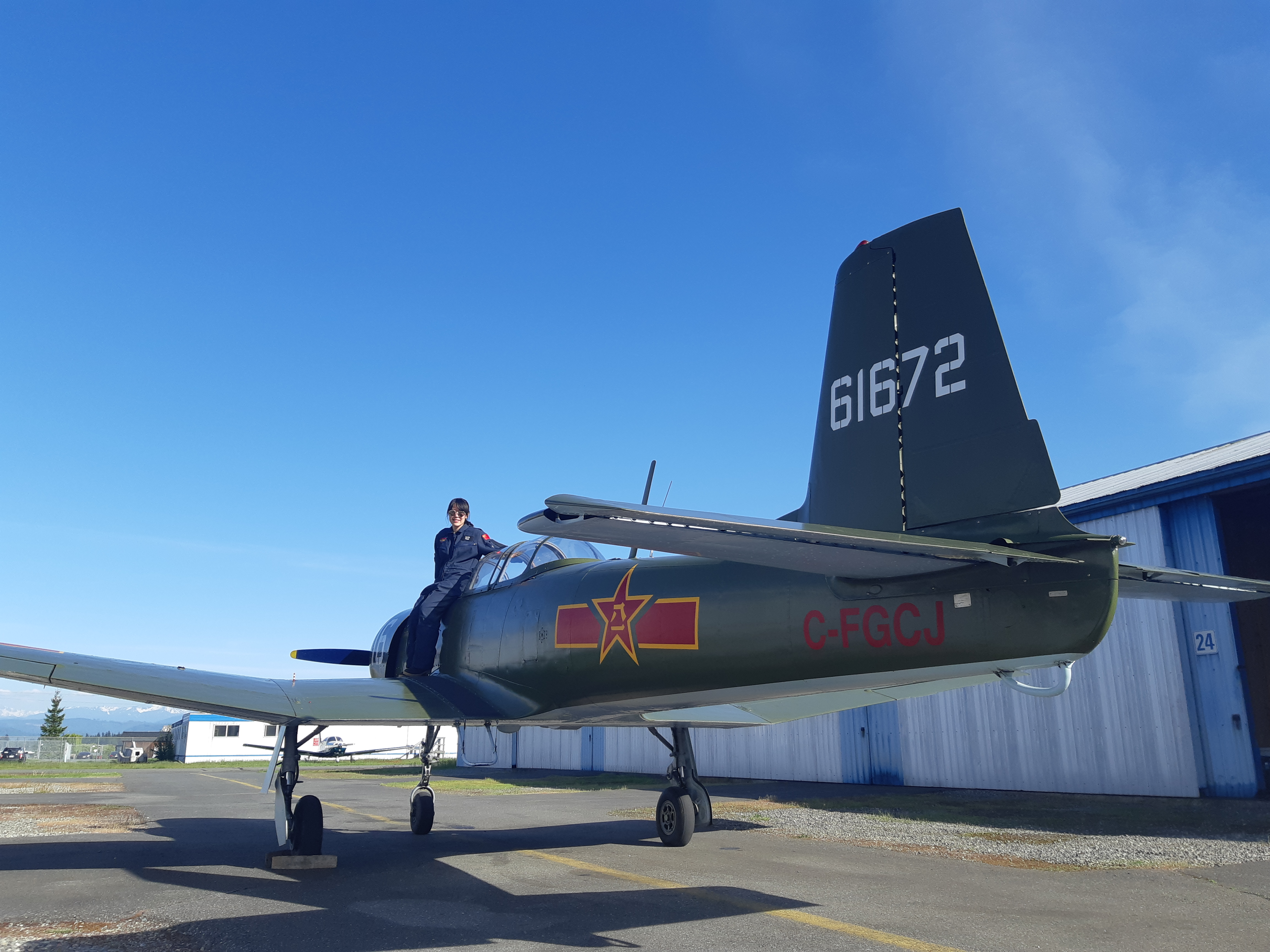
CJ-6 in Abbotsford Canada

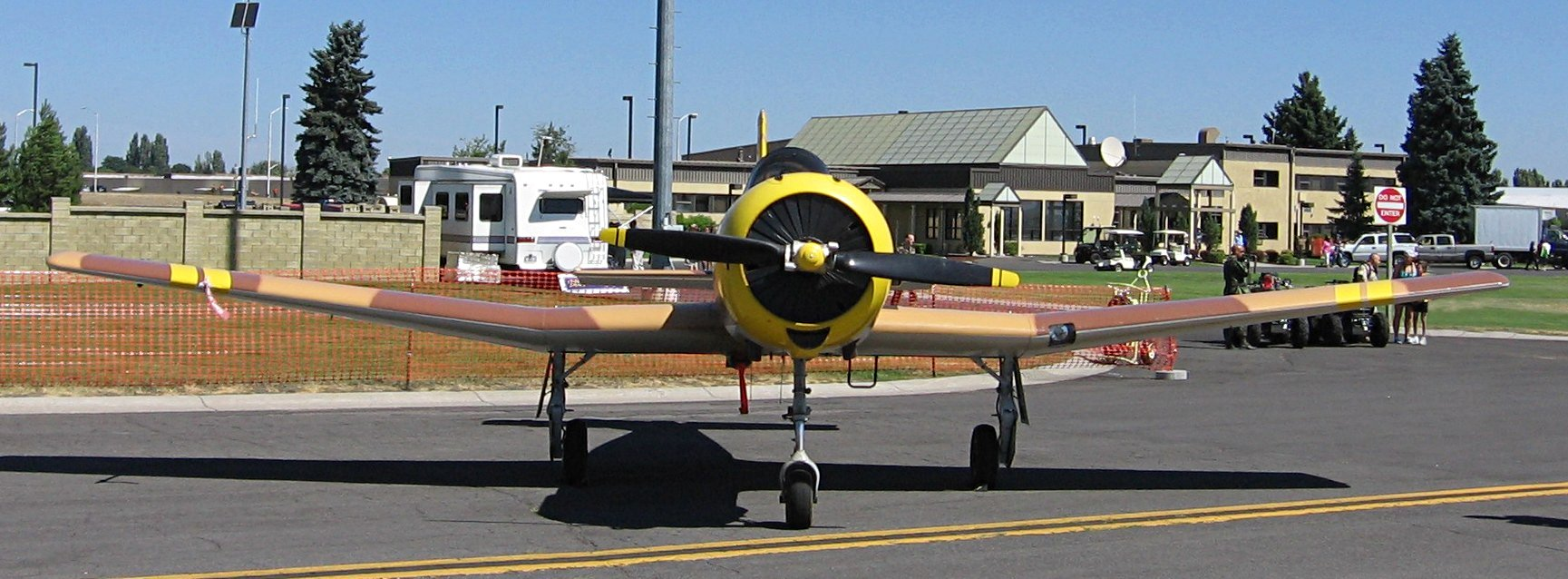
CJ-6A

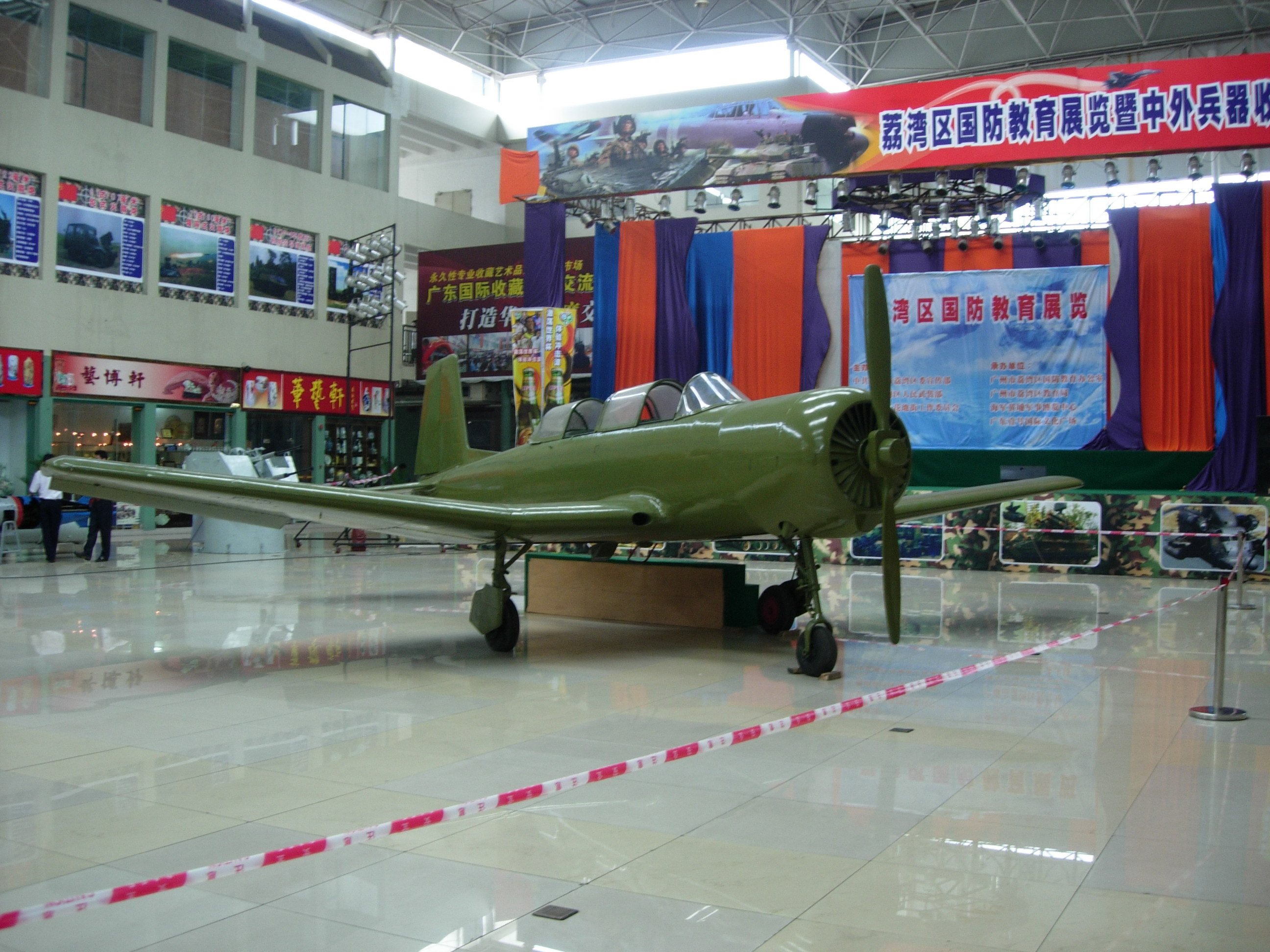
CJ-6 trainer

Hongzhuan-502 (Hongzhuan - Red Craftsman)
Initial designation of production CJ-6 aircraft.
CJ-6
Two-seat primary trainer aircraft, powered by a 260-hp Zhuzhou Huosai HS-6 radial piston engine.
CJ-6A
Improved version, powered by a 285-hp Zhuzhou Huosai HS-6A radial piston engine.
CJ-6B
Two-seat armed border patrol aircraft, powered by a 300-hp Zhuzhou Huosai HS-6D radial piston engine. Small number built.
PT-6
Export designation of the CJ-6 and CJ-6A.
PT-6A
Export version of the CJ-6A
Haiyan A (Haiyan - Petrel)
Haiyan prototype. First flew on August 17, 1985.
Haiyan B
Single-seat agricultural topdressing, aerial spraying, fire-fighting aircraft, fitted with an upgraded 345-hp Huosai HS-6 radial piston engine.
Haiyan C
General aviation variant for agriculture and leisure flight.

== Operators ==
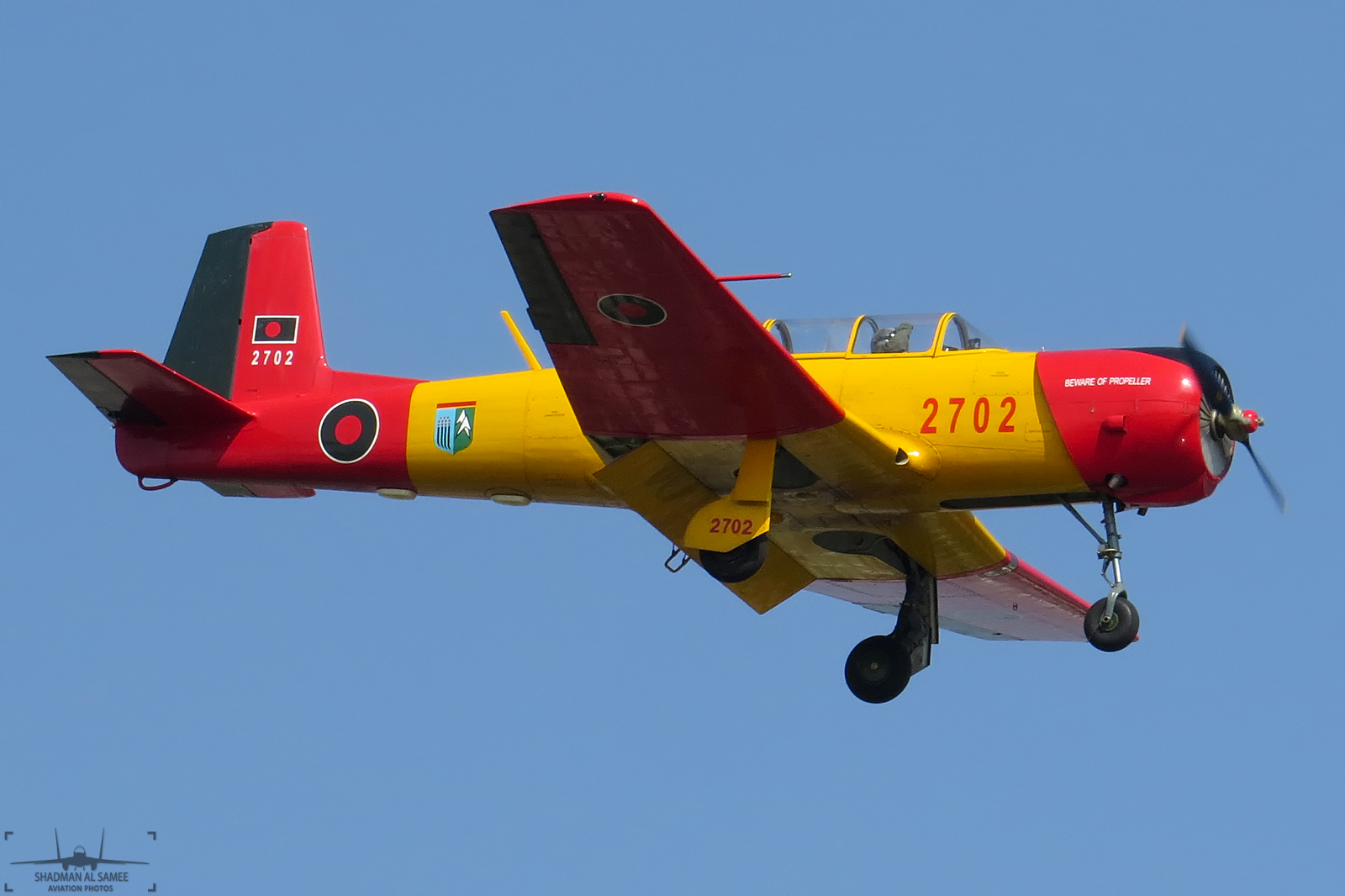
Bangladesh Air Force PT-6A

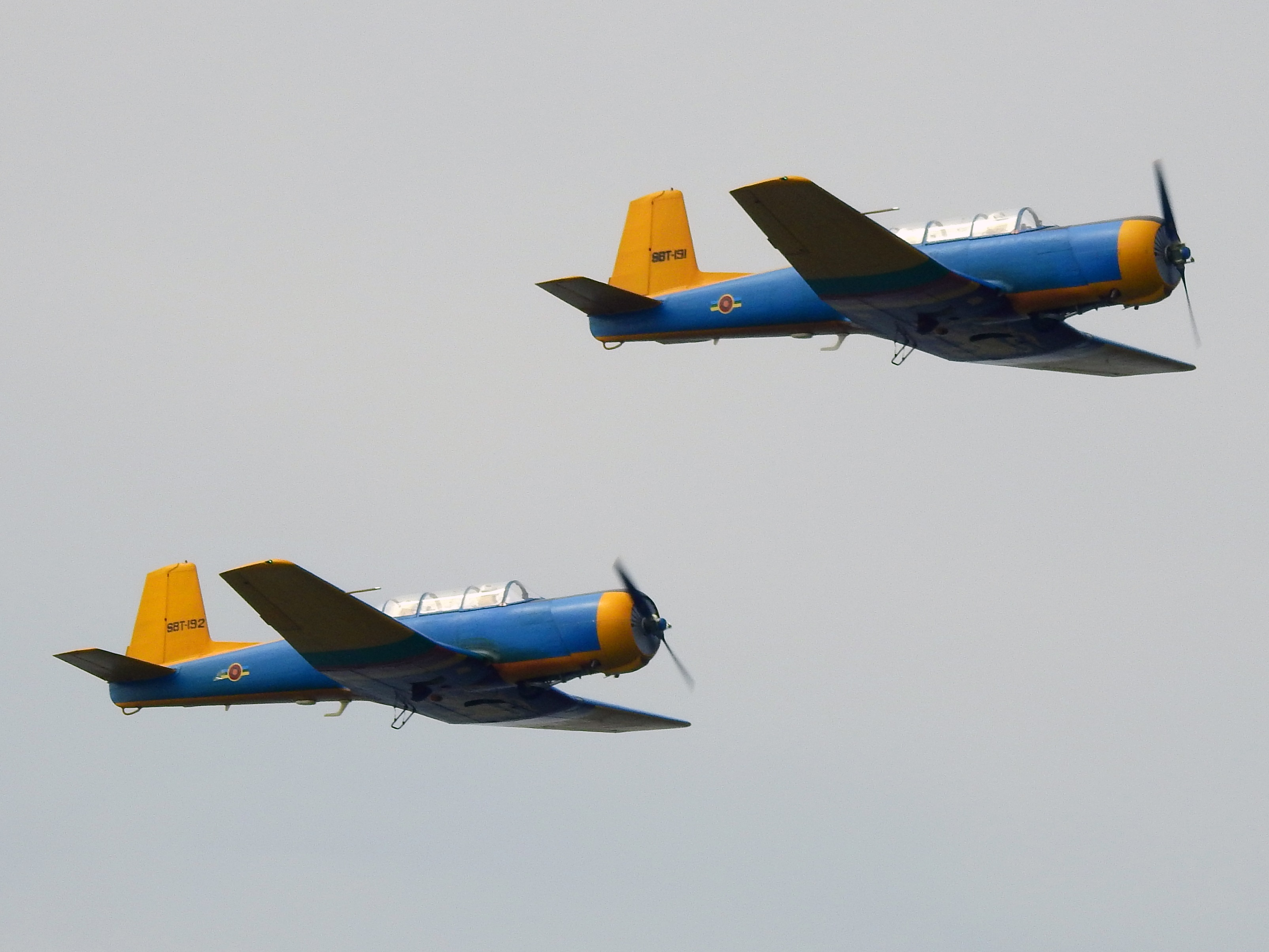
Sri Lanka Air Force PT-6

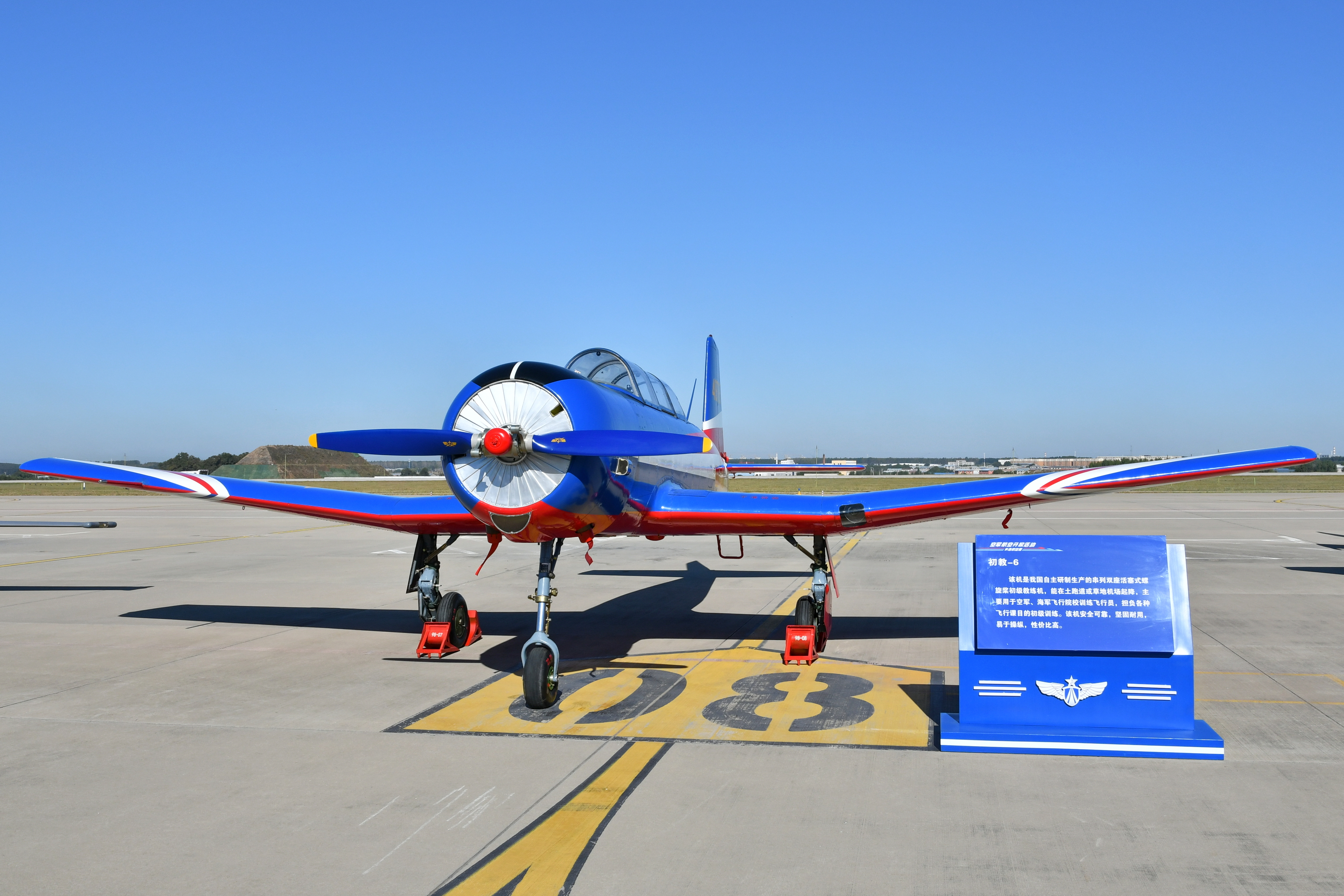
PLAAF CJ-6 on display

Albania

- Albanian Air Force - In 1962, ten BT-6s were imported and put into service, followed by 20 BT-6As in 1966 and 1971.

Bangladesh

- Bangladesh Air Force: ≤ 24 PT-6 in service.

Cambodia

- Khmer Air Force

Ecuador

- Ecuadorian Army Aviation

China

- People's Liberation Army Air Force
- People's Liberation Army Navy Air Force

North Korea

- Korean People's Army Air Force

Laos

- Lao People's Liberation Army Air Force

Sri Lanka

- Sri Lanka Air Force

Tanzania

- Tanzania Air Force Command

Zambia

- Zambian Air Force

=== Civilian use ===
Due to its low price and sturdy construction, the CJ-6A is a popular hobby plane. The aircraft appears on the civil register of the US, Australia, New Zealand, UK, South Africa and other countries.

A used CJ-6 in the United States can cost as little as $75,000. At Cameron Airpark Estates in California, former US Air Force squadron commander Carl Gremlick operates a restored CJ-6 from his home hangar and is part of a local community of pilots who taxi their aircraft on the neighborhood’s wide streets.

In Australia, CJ-6 aircraft are generally operated in the Limited Category. This is administered by the Australian Warbirds Association Limited (AWAL). The AWAL operates under an approval from the Australian government's Civil Aviation Safety Authority (CASA) to manage the operation of ex-military aircraft.

== Accidents and incidents ==
- 15 December 2020: A Sri Lanka Air Force Chinese-manufactured Nanchang CJ-6, also known as PT-6, a primary trainer aircraft, which took off from China Bay Airport crashed near Kantale, Sri Lanka killing the trainee pilot on board.
- 5 July 2021: A privately owned CJ-6A was involved in a collision with a lawn maintenance machine while attempting to land at Saint-Esprit Aerodrome, killing the operator of the lawn machine and damaging the aircraft. The pilot was uninjured.
- 7 August 2023: A Sri Lanka Air Force Chinese-manufactured Nanchang CJ-6, also known as PT-6, a primary trainer aircraft, crashed shortly after departing from China Bay Airport, resulting in the fatalities of the two officers who were on board. Following this incident, the Sri Lanka Air Force grounded the entire PT-6 aircraft fleet until a thorough investigation is conducted and completed.

== Specifications (CJ-6A) ==
Data from Jane's Aircraft Recognition Guide

General characteristics

- Crew: 2
- Length: 8.46 m (27 ft 9 in)
- Wingspan: 10.22 m (33 ft 6 in)
- Height: 3.3 m (10 ft 10 in)
- Airfoil: root: Clark YH (14.5%); tip: Clark YH (9.3%)
- Empty weight: 1,095 kg (2,414 lb)
- Max takeoff weight: 1,400 kg (3,086 lb)
- Powerplant: 1 × Zhouzhou (SMPMC) HS-6A radial engine, 213 kW (286 hp)
- Propellers: 2-bladed variable-pitch propeller

Performance

- Maximum speed: 300 km/h (190 mph, 160 kn)
- Never exceed speed: 370 km/h (230 mph, 200 kn)
- Range: 700 km (430 mi, 380 nmi)
- Service ceiling: 6,250 m (20,510 ft) +

Armament

- Guns: 2 x 7.62 mm machine guns
- Hardpoints: Weapons stations and hardpoints under the wings , with provisions to carry combinations of:
  - Rockets: Rocket launchers
  - Bombs: Bombs
