= Chen Jingrun =

Chinese number theorist

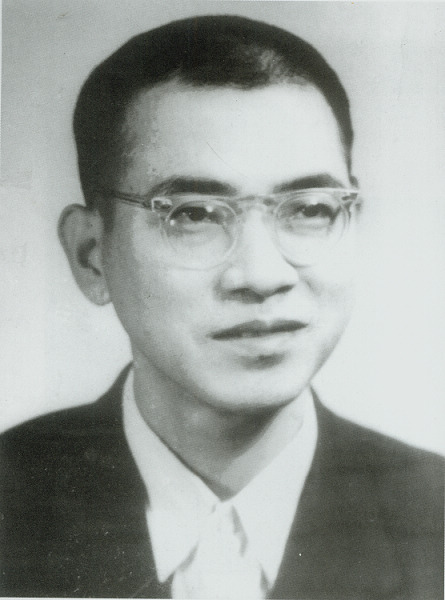
- Born: 22 May 1933; Fuzhou, Fujian, China
- Died: 19 March 1996 (aged 62); Beijing, China
- Education: Chinese Academy of Sciences; Xiamen University
- Known for: Chen's theorem, Chen prime
- Scientific career
- Fields: Mathematics
- Doctoral advisor: Hua Luogeng

Chinese name
- Traditional Chinese: 陳景潤
- Simplified Chinese: 陈景润
Transcriptions
Standard Mandarin
- Hanyu Pinyin: Chén Jǐngrùn
- Wade–Giles: Chʻen^{2} Ching^{3}-jun^{4}
- IPA: [ʈʂʰə̌n tɕìŋ.ɻwə̂n]
Eastern Min
- Fuzhou BUC: Dìng Gīng-nông

Chen Jingrun (simplified Chinese: 陈景润; traditional Chinese: 陳景潤; pinyin: Chén Jǐngrùn; 22 May 1933 – 19 March 1996), also known as Jing-Run Chen, was a Chinese mathematician who made significant contributions to number theory, including Chen's theorem and the Chen prime.

== Life and career ==
Chen was the third son in a large family from Fuzhou, Fujian, China. His father was a postal worker. Chen Jingrun graduated from the Mathematics Department of Xiamen University in 1953. His advisor at the Chinese Academy of Sciences was Hua Luogeng.

His work on the twin prime conjecture, Waring's problem, Goldbach's conjecture and Legendre's conjecture led to progress in analytic number theory. In a 1966 paper he proved what is now called Chen's theorem: every sufficiently large even number can be written as the sum of a prime and a number which is either a prime or a semiprime (the product of two primes). Despite being persecuted during the Cultural Revolution, he expanded his proof in the 1970s.

After the end of the Cultural Revolution, Xu Chi wrote a biography of Chen, Goldbach's Conjecture (哥德巴赫猜想). First published in People's Literature in January 1978, it was reprinted in the People's Daily a month later and became a national sensation. Chen became a household name in China and received a sackful of love letters from all over the country within two months.

Chen died of complications of pneumonia on 19 March 1996, at age 62.

== Legacy ==
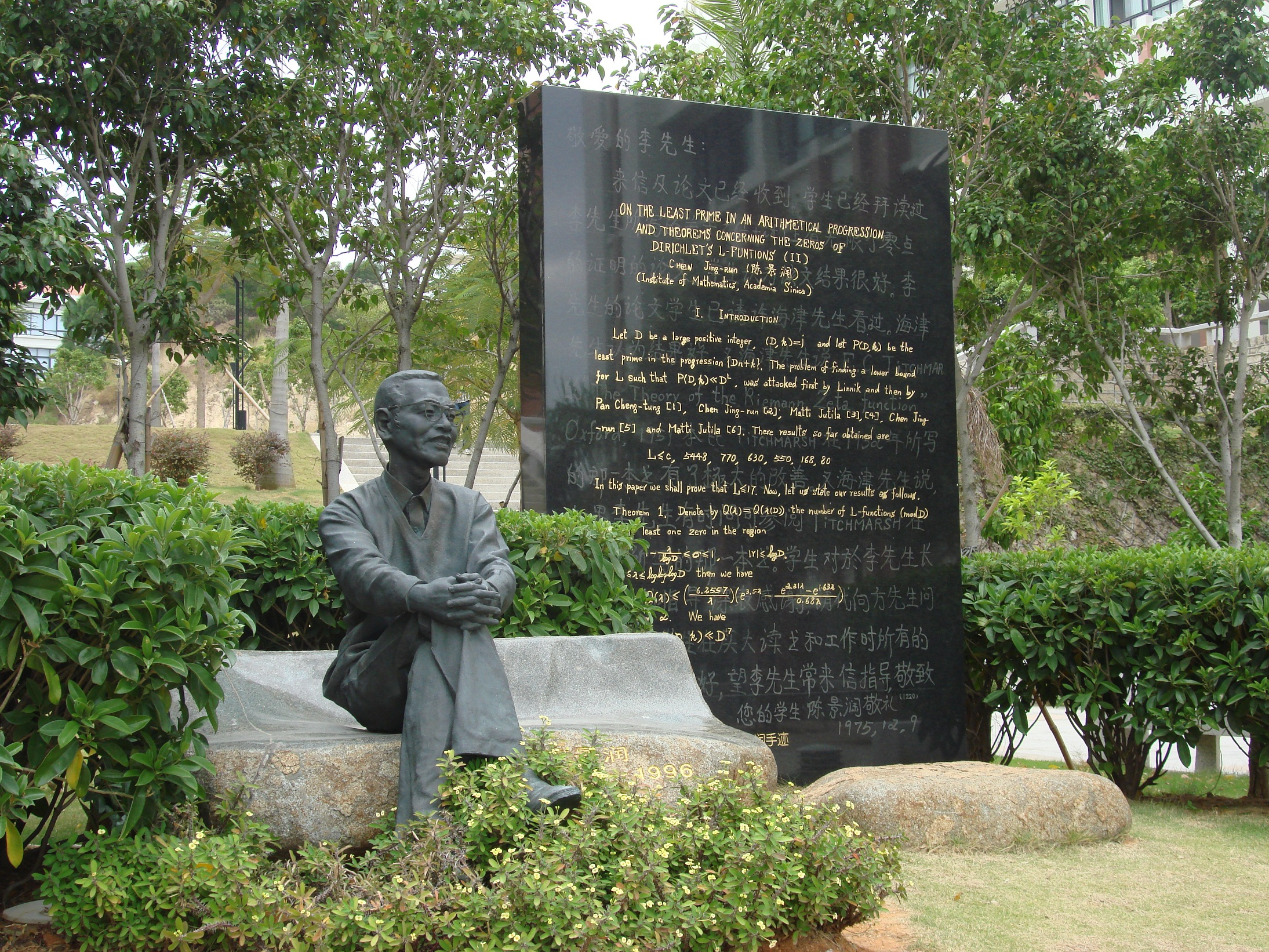
Chen's statue at Xiamen University, China.

The asteroid 7681 Chenjingrun, discovered in 1996, was named after him.

In 1999, China issued an 80-cent postage stamp, titled The Best Result of Goldbach Conjecture, with a silhouette of Chen and the inequality:

$$P_x(1, 2) \ge \frac{0.67xC_x}{(\log x)^2}.$$

Several statues in China have been built in memory of Chen. At Xiamen University, the names of Chen and four other mathematicians—Peter Gustav Lejeune Dirichlet, Matti Jutila, Yuri Linnik, and Pan Chengdong—are inscribed on the marble slab behind Chen's statue.

== Works ==
- "On the representation of a large even integer as the sum of a prime and a product of at most two primes", Sci. Sinica 16 (1973), 157–176.
- "On the representation of a large even integer as the sum of a prime and the product of at most two primes". [Chinese] J. Kexue Tongbao 17 (1966), 385–386.
- "Fundamental Number Theory"
