= Chen's theorem =

Every large even number is either sum of a prime and a semi-prime or two primes

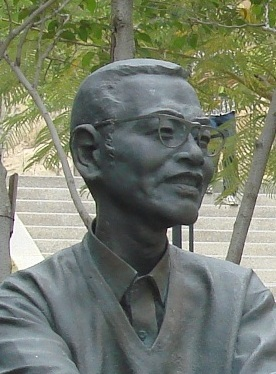
The statue of Chen Jingrun at Xiamen University.

In number theory, Chen's theorem states that every sufficiently large even number can be written as the sum of either two primes or a prime and a semiprime (the product of two primes).

It is a weakened form of Goldbach's conjecture, which states that every even number is the sum of two primes.

== History ==
The theorem was first stated by Chinese mathematician Chen Jingrun in 1966, with further details of the proof in 1973. His original proof was much simplified by P. M. Ross in 1975. Chen's theorem is a significant step towards Goldbach's conjecture, and a celebrated application of sieve methods.

Chen's theorem represents the strengthening of a previous result due to Alfréd Rényi, who in 1947 had shown there exists a finite K such that any even number can be written as the sum of a prime number and the product of at most K primes.

== Variations ==
Chen's 1973 paper stated two results with nearly identical proofs. His Theorem I, on the Goldbach conjecture, was stated above. His Theorem II is a result on the twin prime conjecture. It states that if h is a positive even integer, there are infinitely many primes p such that p + h is either prime or the product of two primes.

Ying Chun Cai proved the following in 2002:

There exists a natural number $N$ such that every even integer $n$ larger than $N$ is a sum of a prime less than or equal to $n^{0.95}$ and a number with at most two prime factors.

In 2022, Daniel R. Johnston, Matteo Bordignon, and Valeriia Starichkova provided an explicit version of Chen's theorem:

Every even number greater than $e^{e^{32.7}} \approx 1.4 \cdot 10^{69057979807814}$ can be represented as the sum of a prime and a square-free number with at most two prime factors.

which refined upon an earlier result by Tomohiro Yamada. Also in 2024, Bordignon and Starichkova showed that the bound can be lowered to $e^{e^{15.85}} \approx 3.6\cdot10^{3321634}$ assuming the generalized Riemann hypothesis (GRH) for Dirichlet L-functions.

In 2019, Huixi Li gave a version of Chen's theorem for odd numbers. In particular, Li proved that every sufficiently large odd integer $N$ can be represented as

$$N=p+2a,$$

where $p$ is prime and $a$ has at most 2 prime factors. Here, the factor of 2 is necessitated since every prime (except for 2) is odd, causing $N-p$ to be even. Li's result can be viewed as an approximation to Lemoine's conjecture.
