= Huang Zhiquan (politician, born 1908) =

Chinese politician and educator

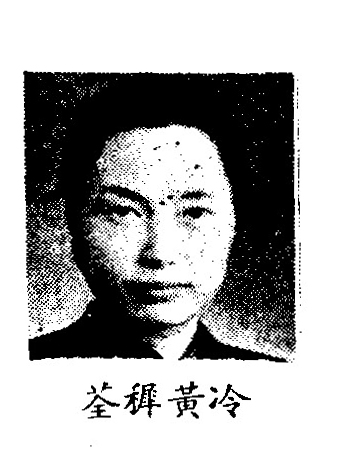

Member of the Legislative Yuan
- In office 1948–

Personal details
- Born: 26 January 1908
- Died: 20 March 1993 (aged 85)

Huang Zhiquan (Chinese: 黃穉荃, 26 January 1908 – 20 March 1993) was a Chinese politician. She was among the first group of women elected to the Legislative Yuan in 1948.

== Biography ==
Huang was born in 1908, the daughter of Huang Quanzhai, a Senator from Sichuan Province. She entered National Higher Normal School in Chengdu in 1925. In 1930 she returned to Jiang'an County and taught in a middle school. She joined the history department at the Academy of Peking Normal University in 1931, but dropped out due to illness, returning to Chengdu in 1933. She married Leng Rong, a member of the standing committee of the Mongolian and Tibetan Affairs Commission, who became Minister of Civil Affairs in Xikang Province, and the representative of Liu Wenhui in Nanjing.

In the spring of 1943, Huang was appointed to the second provisional Senate of Sichuan Province. Her husband was assassinated by a Xikang warlord in May the same year, resulting in her not taking her place in the Senate. She was subsequently a candidate in Sichuan Province in the 1948 elections to the Legislative Yuan, in which she was elected to the national parliament.

After the Chinese Civil War she worked at Chengdu Daxuan College. She joined the Chongqing Chinese People's Political Consultative Conference in 1955. Following the Cultural Revolution, she was transferred to the Chengdu CPPCC. In 1982 she became a librarian in the Sichuan Provincial Museum of Literature and History.
