= Ye Zhengda =

Chinese PLAAF lieutenant general and aircraft designer

- 叶正大
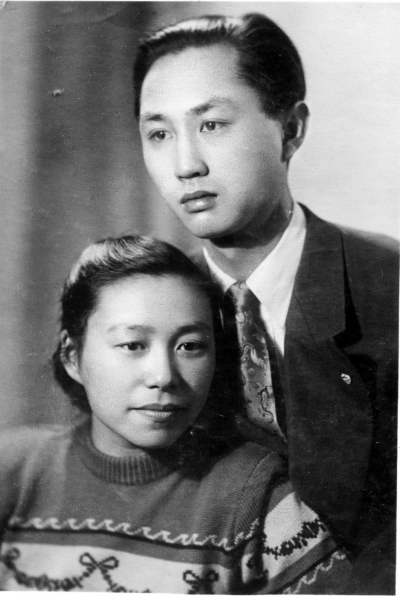
- Ye Zhengda and wife Ren Yue in Moscow (1954)

Personal details
- Born: Ye Funong (叶福农); August 22, 1927 Shanghai, China
- Died: December 14, 2017 (aged 90) Beijing, China
- Party: Chinese Communist Party
- Spouse: Ren Yue
- Parent(s): Ye Ting; Li Xiuwen
- Education: Moscow Aviation Institute

Military service
- Allegiance: People's Republic of China
- Branch/service: People's Liberation Army Air Force
- Years of service: 1955–1998
- Rank: Lieutenant general
- Awards: Victory Medal (1998)

Chinese name
- Traditional Chinese: 葉正大
- Simplified Chinese: 叶正大
Transcriptions
Standard Mandarin
- Hanyu Pinyin: Yè Zhèngdà
- Wade–Giles: Yeh Cheng-ta

Ye Zhengda (Chinese: 叶正大; 22 August 1927 – 14 December 2017) was a Chinese aircraft designer and lieutenant general of the People's Liberation Army Air Force. He was also an adjunct professor and senior engineer at Northwestern Polytechnical University. He was a member of the 10th National Congress of the Chinese Communist Party and a delegate to the 5th National People's Congress.

== Biography ==
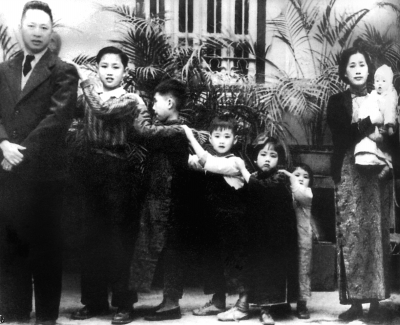
Ye Ting's family in Macau in 1939. Ye Ting is first from the left and Ye Zhengda is second from the left.

Ye was born Ye Funong (叶福农) on 22 August 1927 in Shanghai, with his ancestral home in Huiyang, Guangdong. He was the first of nine children of the famous general Ye Ting and his wife Li Xiuwen, who both died in a plane crash in 1946. His siblings included Ye Zhengming (叶正明, 1931–2003), Ye Huaming (叶华明, born 1935), Ye Jianmei (叶剑梅, 1937–1993), Ye Yangmei (叶扬眉, 1936–1946), Ye Zhengguang (叶正光, born 1939), and Ye Qiguang (born 1942).

In 1947, Ye attended a Russian-language school in northeastern China founded by the Northeast Democratic United Army. He joined the Chinese Communist Party in the following year. He graduated from Moscow Aviation Institute in 1955, where he majored in aircraft production.

In August 1956, China established its first aircraft design office at Shenyang Aircraft Corporation, with Xu Shunshou as director. Ye Zhengda and Huang Zhiqian were appointed deputy directors. He participated in the design of China's first trainer jet, the Shenyang JJ-1.

He later served as deputy dean of the Six Research Institute of the PRC Ministry of National Defense, deputy director of Defense Industry of the State Council of the People's Republic of China, deputy director of the Science and Technology Committee of the Commission for Science, Technology and Industry for National Defense, and director of the 2nd and 3rd Chinese Society of Aeronautics and Astronautics. He was awarded the military rank of lieutenant general (zhongjiang) in 1988. He retired in 1998.

On December 14, 2017, he died in Beijing.

== Personal life ==
Ye Zhengda married Ren Yue (Chinese: 任岳), an actress of the August First Film Studio, in Moscow.

== Awards ==
- Special Prize of the National Prize for Progress in Science and Technology
- Second Prize of the National Prize for Progress in Science and Technology
- First Prize for Military Scientific Research Achievements of the People's Liberation Army (PLA)
- Second Prize of Military Scientific Research Achievements of the People's Liberation Army (PLA)
- 1998 - Victory Medal
