= Huang Zhiqian =

Chinese aerospace engineer (1914–1965)

- 黄志千
- Born: Huang Yongxun (黄永埙); January 14, 1914; Huaiyin, Jiangsu, Republic of China
- Died: May 20, 1965 (aged 51); Cairo, Egypt
- Citizenship: China
- Education: National Chiao Tung University
- Occupation: Engineer
- Engineering career
- Discipline: Aeronautical engineering
- Employer(s): Shenyang Aircraft Design Institute
- Projects: Shenyang JJ-1; Nanchang CJ-6; Nanchang Q-5; Shenyang J-8

Huang Zhiqian (Chinese: 黄志千; Wade–Giles: Huang Chih-ch'ien; 24 January 1914 – 20 May 1965) was a Chinese aircraft designer. He served as Chief Designer of the Shenyang Aircraft Design Institute and was in charge of designing the Shenyang J-8, China's first high-speed, high-altitude interceptor fighter jet. Before the project was completed, he died in the Pakistan International Airlines Flight 705 crash in Cairo, Egypt, in 1965.

== Early life ==
Huang was born Huang Yongxun (黄永埙) on 24 January 1914 in Huaiyin County, Jiangsu, Republic of China. He studied at Yuanjiang Middle School, but had to drop out because of family poverty. He continued to self-study, and was accepted into the Department of Mechanics of National Chiao Tung University, Shanghai in 1934. He graduated in 1937.

== Career ==
=== Republic of China ===
Soon after Huang graduated from university, the Second Sino-Japanese War broke out, and he enlisted in the Republic of China Air Force to join the resistance war. He received training at the air force's mechanics school until April 1938, and served at the Central Aircraft Manufacturing Company in Leiyun (or Loiwing), Kunming, Bhamo (Burma), and Xinjin (Sichuan). His main duties were servicing warplanes including the American-made Hawk III and the Soviet-made Polikarpov I-15 and I-16, and maintaining the airports.

In October 1944, Huang was hired by Convair to work in the United States, where he participated in the manufacture and testing of the B-24 bomber. After the surrender of Japan and the end of World War II in 1945, Huang entered the University of Michigan to study aerodynamics. Less than a year later, the Kuomintang government of the Republic of China signed a deal with Britain's Gloster Aircraft Company to jointly manufacture fighter jets, and sent Huang to England in September 1946. He studied the Gloster Meteor fighter and participated in the design of the Gloster E.1/44.

=== People's Republic of China ===
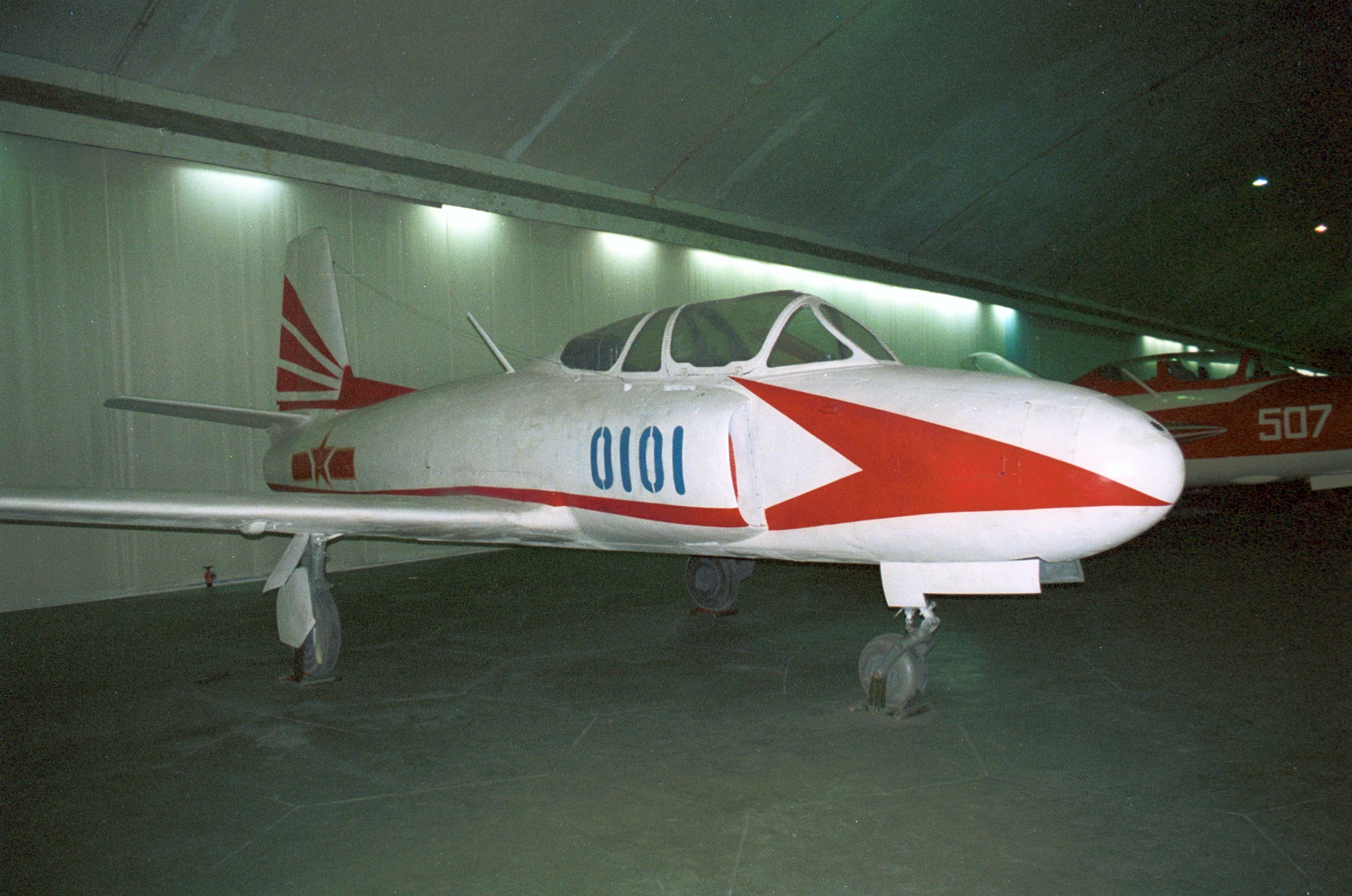
Shenyang JJ-1 jet trainer

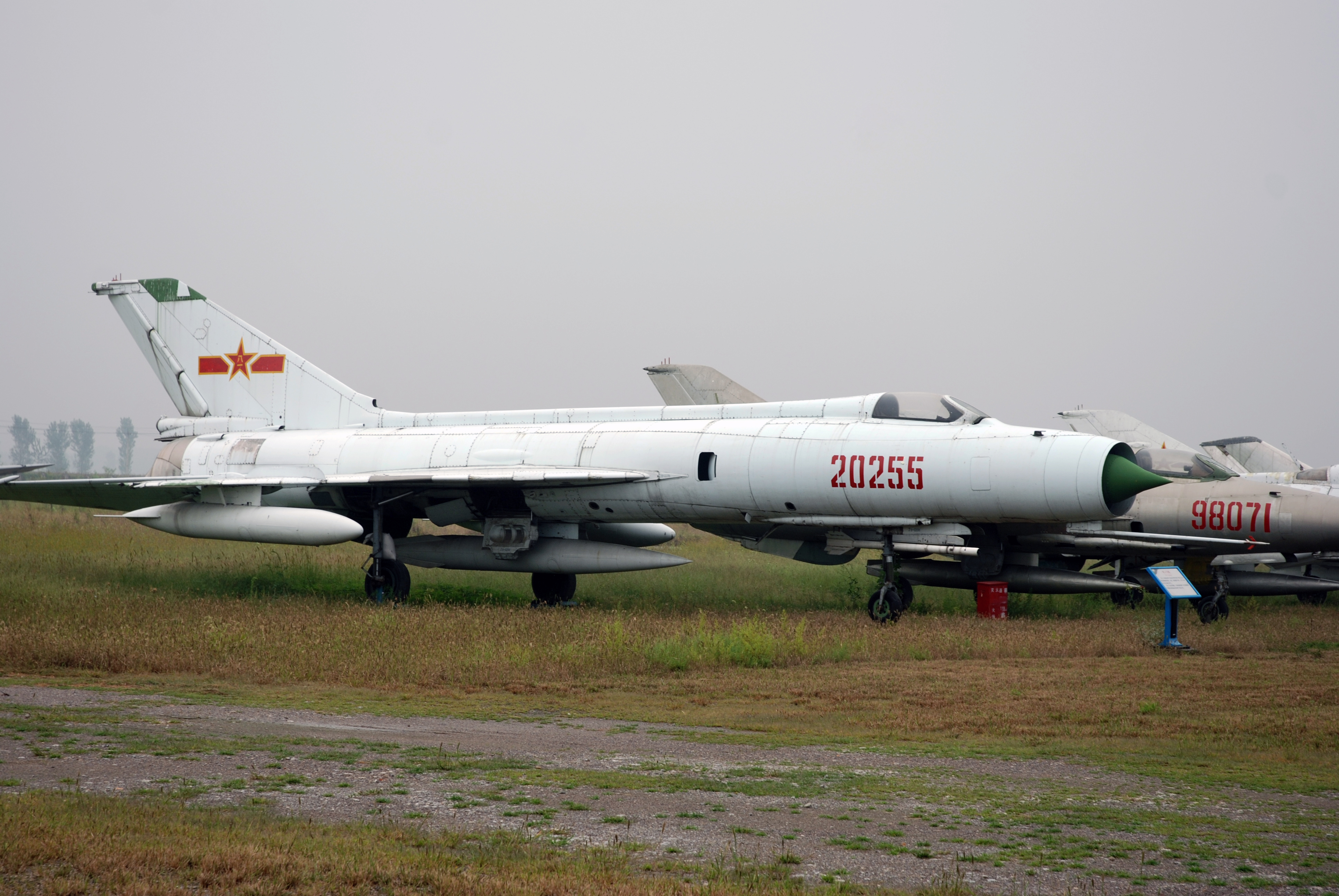
Shenyang J-8 interceptor

Huang returned to China in June 1949, near the end of the Chinese Civil War. As the Kuomintang lost the war and retreated to Taiwan, Huang stayed on the mainland and worked for the victorious Communist Party.

In 1949, Huang oversaw the reconstruction of the military Jian'ou Airport in Jian'ou, Fujian Province. In July 1951, he was transferred to the Shenyang Aircraft Corporation and put in charge of repairing the PLA Air Force's MiG-9 and MiG-15 fighters then being deployed in the Korean War.

In August 1956, the Aviation Industry Bureau established the PRC's first airplane design office in Shenyang, with Xu Shunshou as director and Huang Zhiqian and Ye Zhengda as deputy directors. They led the design of the jet trainer, Shenyang JJ-1. The plane took its first flight on 26 July 1958, which marked a new era of China's aviation industry. He then participated in the design of the Nanchang CJ-6 and the Nanchang Q-5 aircraft.

In August 1961, China established its first research institute for aircraft design, the Shenyang Aircraft Design Institute (code name 601 Institute), and Huang was named its chief designer. In October 1964, the Chinese government decided to design and build its first high-speed, high-altitude interceptor fighter jet, later named the Shenyang J-8. Huang was appointed its chief designer, with Gu Songfen serving as his deputy.

== Death ==
On 20 May 1965, Huang took the Pakistan International Airlines Flight 705 for a business trip to Western Europe. He died when the plane crashed in Cairo, Egypt, aged 51. He was later recognized by the Central Military Commission as a "martyr". After his death, Gu Songfen took charge of the J-8 project, and the jet took its maiden flight on 5 July 1969.
