= Shenyang JJ-1 =

Jet trainer developed in the People's Republic of China

JJ-1
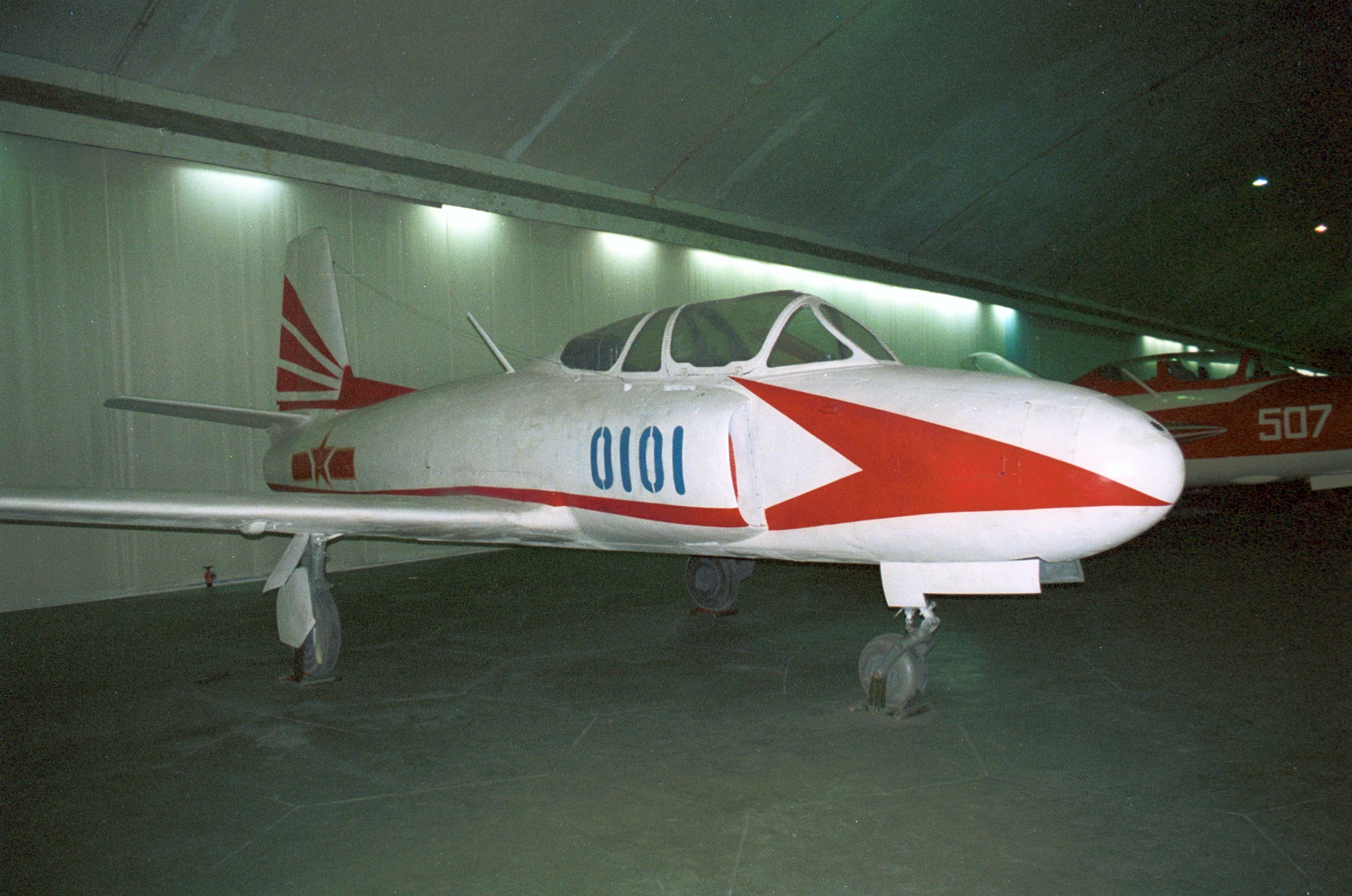
- A JJ-1 in the Chinese Aviation Museum at Datangshan, north of Beijing

General information
- Type: Jet trainer
- National origin: People's Republic of China (PRC)
- Manufacturer: Shenyang Aircraft Corporation
- Number built: 3 (two flying, one static)

History
- First flight: 26 July 1958

The Shenyang JJ-1, also known as the Hong Zhuan-503 or Red Special, is a jet trainer developed in the People's Republic of China (PRC) during the 1950s. It was the first jet aircraft designed in China, with Xu Shunshou as the chief designer. Two prototypes flew, but further development was abandoned.

== Design and development ==
Due to differences in ideology the Soviet Union severed relations with the PRC in the late 1950s, robbing the PRC of access to modern Soviet technology, particularly aircraft and aviation-related items. To ensure that the People's Liberation Army Air Force could re-equip and train to fly jet fighters Shenyang Aircraft Corporation were approached by the PLAAF to design and build a prototype jet trainer.

Xu Shunshou served as the director designer, and Huang Zhiqian and Ye Zhengda were deputy designers. Xu led a team of 108 people, whose average age was only 22. Most team members were recent university graduates, and only three people: Xu, Huang, and Lu Xiaopeng, had any aircraft design experience.

To fill the PLAAF requirement, the designers at Shenyang produced the JJ-1, a straight-winged aircraft, with a retractable tricycle undercarriage, tandem cockpits with a side hinged canopy over the front cockpit and rearward sliding canopy over the rear cockpit (very similar to the Shenyang JJ-5) and intakes either side of the front cockpit.

Power was supplied by a Shenyang Aircraft Development Office PF-1A, (Chinese copy of the Klimov RD-500 itself a copy of the Rolls-Royce Derwent), centrifugal compressor turbojet fitted in the centre fuselage, exhausting through a jet pipe extending to the tail of the fuselage. Armament was to have been a single 23 mm (0.91 in) calibre automatic cannon.

Production was not carried out as it was found that pilots could transition to basic jet fighters from propeller driven fighters with few problems. Nevertheless, as the first jet aircraft designed in China, the JJ-1 marked a new era of China's aircraft manufacturing industry.

== Operational history ==
Testing was carried out on the two prototypes and static test airframe before development was cancelled.

== Specifications (JJ-1) ==
Data from International Resin Modellers, Chinese Aircraft: China's aviation industry since 1951

General characteristics

- Crew: 2
- Length: 10.56 m (34 ft 8 in)
- Wingspan: 11.43 m (37 ft 6 in)
- Height: 3.94 m (12 ft 11 in)
- Max takeoff weight: 4,602 kg (10,146 lb)
- Powerplant: 1 × SADO PF-1A centrifugal compressor turbojet

Performance

- Maximum speed: 840 km/h (520 mph, 450 kn) at 8,000 m (26,000 ft)
- Range: 1,328 km (825 mi, 717 nmi)

Armament
1x 23 mm (0.91 in) automatic cannon

== See also ==
Aircraft of comparable role, configuration, and era

- Lockheed T-33
