= Shenyang Aircraft Design Institute =

Chinese aircraft design institute

Shenyang Aircraft Design Institute (Chinese: 沈阳飞机设计研究所; pinyin: Shěnyáng Fēijī Shèjì Yánjiū Suǒ; or 601 Institute) is a Chinese aircraft design institute of the Shenyang Aircraft Corporation, specializing in the design of military aircraft.

== Products ==
- Shenyang J-5
- Shenyang J-6
- Shenyang J-8
- Variants of Shenyang J-11, such as J-11B
- Shenyang J-15
- Shenyang J-16
- Shenyang J-35
