= List of aerospace engineers =

This is a list of notable aerospace engineers, people who were trained in or practiced aerospace engineering and design.

== A ==
- Talbert Abrams (1895–1990) – aerial photography and plexiglas pioneer, designer of the Abrams P-1 Explorer
- Gerd Achgelis (1908–1991) – helicopter pioneer
- Jakob Ackeret (1898–1981) – aerodynamicist, proposed the Mach number
- Clément Ader (1841–1925) – early aviation pioneer
- Bruce Aikenhead (1923–2019) – Avro Canada, NASA
- Buzz Aldrin (born 1930) – astronaut, mechanical engineer and second person to walk on the Moon
- Rostislav Alexeyev (1916–1980) – ground effect vehicle designer
- Edmund T. Allen (1896–1943) – engineer, test pilot
- Harry Julian Allen (1910–1977) – NASA, inventor of blunt body re-entry vehicles
- Gwen Alston (1907–1993) – aerodynamicist
- Hans Amtmann (1906–2007) – Blohm & Voss designer
- Oleg Antonov (1906–1984) – founder of the OKB-153 Antonov design bureau
- Neil Armstrong (1930–2012) – astronaut, aeronautical engineer and first person to walk on the Moon
- Yuri Artsutanov (1929–2019) – space elevator pioneer
- Holt Ashley (1923–2006) – researched aeroelasticity
- Lee Atwood (1904–1999) – North American Aviation engineer

== B ==
- Brunolf Baade (1904–1969) – lead designer of the Baade 152
- Erich Bachem (1906–1960) – designer of the Bachem Ba 349 Natter rocket plane
- Leonard Bairstow (1880–1963) – National Physical Laboratory (United Kingdom) researcher
- Herman Barkey (1909–2005) – led the design team for the McDonnell Aircraft F-4 Phantom
- V. P. Barmin (1909–1993) – designer of the rocket launch complex
- Frank Barnwell (1880–1938) – chief engineer Bristol Aeroplane Company
- Robert Ludvigovich Bartini (1897–1974) – designer of the Bartini Beriev VVA-14 and other experimental projects, founder of the OKB-86 design bureau
- Yaakov Bar-Shalom (born 1941) – researcher of target tracking
- L. E. Baynes (1902–1989) – designer of the Baynes Bat tank glider
- Jim Bede (1933–2015)
- Hermann Behrbohm (1907–1977) – aerodynamicist at Messerschmidt and Saab
- Rex Beisel (1893–1972) – lead engineer at Curtiss and Vought
- Giuseppe Mario Bellanca (1886–1960) – aircraft pioneer, blended wing designer
- Viktor Nikolayevich Belyaev (1896—1953) – strength engineer, designer of the Belyayev DB-LK
- Dwight Henry Bennett (1917–2002) – developed Fly-by-wire technology, helped design the F2Y, F-102, F-4 Phantom, F/A-18
- Thomas W. Benoist (1874–1917) – early airline entrepreneur
- Igor Bensen (1917–2000) – autogyro designer
- Max Bentele (1909–2006) – jet engine pioneer
- Aleksandr Bereznyak (1912–1974) – designer of the BI-1 rocket plane
- Georgy Beriev (1903–1979) – founder of the OKB-49 Beriev design bureau
- J. D. Bernal (1901–1971) – invented the Bernal sphere for space habitation
- Albert Betz (1885–1968) – designer and researcher
- Paul Bevilaqua (born 1945) – lift fan inventor
- Ronald Eric Bishop (1903–1989) - chief designer of the de Havilland Mosquito
- Matus Bisnovat (1905–1977) – missile designer
- Robert Blackburn (1885–1955) – aviation pioneer
- Louis Blériot (1872–1936) – aviation pioneer
- George Eugene Bockrath (1911–1998) – researched fracture mechanics
- Hendrik Wade Bode (1905–1982) – NASA advisor
- Jenny Body – former President of the Royal Aeronautical Society
- William Boeing (1881–1956) – founder of Boeing
- Charles Bolden (born 1946) – NASA Administrator
- Viktor Bolkhovitinov (1899–1970) – lead designer of the Bolkhovitinov DB-A bomber, founder of the OKB-293 design bureau
- Ludwig Bölkow (1912–2003) – aerodynamicist for the Me 262
- Alan Bond (born 1944) – designed spaceplanes and an SST
- Philip Bono (1921–1993) – space launcher developer
- Frank Borman (1928-2023) – commanded first mission to circle the Moon
- Karel Bossart (1904–1975) – lead designer of the Atlas ICBM
- Enea Bossi Sr. (1888–1963) – aviation pioneer
- William Hawley Bowlus (1896–1967) – glider designer
- John Boyd (1927–1997) – created the energy–maneuverability theory
- Frances Bradfield (1895–1967) – wind tunnel researcher
- Ferdinand Brandner (1903–1986) – aircraft engine designer
- Erik Bratt (1916–2010) – lead designer at Saab AB
- Vance Breese (1904–1973) – engineer and test pilot
- Louis Charles Breguet (1880–1955) – aviation pioneer, founder of Bréguet Aviation
- Maurice Brennan (1913–1986) – designer of flying boats, helicopters, transports, rockets, hovercraft
- Yvonne Brill (1924–2013) – electrothermal hydrazine thruster
- Lars Brising (1915-1995) – chief designer of the Saab 29 Tunnan
- Arthur E. Bryson (born 1925) – "father of modern optimal control theory"
- Isabelle Buret – engineer specializing in telecommunications and astronautics
- Vincent Burnelli (1895–1964) – blended wing and lifting body designer
- Anne Burns (1915–2001) – wind shear expert
- Adolf Busemann (1901–1986) – swept wing
- Robert W. Bussard (1928–2007) – designer of nuclear thermal rocket engines
- Fedor Ivanovich Bylinkin – aviation pioneer

== C ==
- Sydney Camm (1893–1966) – Hawker Hurricane designer
- Secondo Campini (1904–1980) – jet engine pioneer
- Giovanni Caproni (1886–1957) – founder of Caproni
- Albert Caquot (1881–1976) – aviation pioneer
- George Carter (1889–1969) – designer of the Gloster Meteor
- Mario Castoldi (1888–1968) – chief designer at Aeronautica Macchi
- Beatrice Mabel Cave-Browne-Cave (1874–1947) – undertook pioneering work in the mathematics of aeronautics
- George Cayley (1773–1857) – notable for his research in aerodynamics
- Clyde Cessna (1879–1954) – early aircraft designer and founder of Cessna
- Roy Chadwick (1893–1947) – design engineer for the Avro Company
- Roger Chaffee (1935–1967) – Apollo 1 fire victim on January 27, 1967
- George Henry Challenger (1881–1947) – engineer with the Bristol Aeroplane Company and later with Vickers
- Jim Chamberlin (1915–1981) – Avro Canada, NASA
- Roy Chaplin (1899–1988) – Hawker Aircraft
- George Chapline Jr. (born 1942) – proposer of a fission-fragment rocket
- Kalpana Chawla (1961–2003) – died in the Columbia disaster
- Vladimir Chelomey (1914–1984) – founder of the OKB-52 rocket design bureau
- Boris Ivanovich Cheranovsky (1896–1960) – flying wing designer
- Boris Chertok (1912–2011) – space program control systems designer
- Chu Chia-Jen (1900–1985)
- Thomas P. Christie (born 1934) – mathematician, co-creator of the Energy–maneuverability theory with John Boyd
- Zbysław Ciołkosz (1902–1960) – introduced the use of shaft turbine power for helicopters
- John Drury Clark (1907–1988) – developer of jet and rocket fuel
- Val Cleaver (1917–1977) – rocket engineer
- Henri Coandă (1886–1972) – inventor of the jet engine
- Richard Coar (1921–2013) – RJ10 rocket engine designer
- Christopher Cockerell (1910–1999) – hovercraft inventor
- Dandridge MacFarlan Cole (1921–1965) – Titan II designer
- Franklin R. Collbohm (1907–1990) – Douglas test pilot, engineer, and executive, co-founder of the RAND Corporation
- Giuseppe Colombo (1920–1984) – developed the gravitational assist profile used in the Mariner 10 mission to Mercury, invented the space tether
- Nicholas Comper (1897–1939) – designer of the Comper Swift
- Philip M. Condit (born 1941) – former CEO of Boeing
- René Couzinet (1904–1956) – invented retractable landing gear
- Eugene E. Covert (1926–2015) – wind tunnel designer
- Ray Creasey (1921–1976) aerodynamicist, helped design the BAC Lightning
- Gaetano Crocco (1877–1968) – rocketry pioneer
- Scott Crossfield (1921–2006) – first man to fly faster than twice the speed of sound in NAA's X-15
- Alwyn Crow (1894–1965) – rocket designer
- Irv Culver (1911–1999) – P-38 designer
- Glenn Curtiss (1878–1930) – founder of the US aircraft industry
- Kazimierz Czarnecki (1916–2005) – NACA and NASA engineer

== D ==
- Werner Dahm (1917–2008)
- Frederick Dallenbach – Auxiliary power unit designer
- Corradino D'Ascanio (1891–1981) – helicopter pioneer
- Marcel Dassault (1892–1986)
- Serge Dassault (1925–2018)
- Arthur Davenport (1891–1976) – Westland Aircraft
- Fred David (1898–1992) – designer at Heinkel, Mitsubishi, Aichi Kokuki and Commonwealth Aircraft Corporation
- Stuart Davies (1906–1995) – designed the Avro Lancaster and Vulcan
- Leonardo da Vinci (1452–1519)
- Geoffrey de Havilland (1882–1965)
- Louis de Monge (1890–1977) – blended wing inventor
- Juan de la Cierva (1895–1936) – inventor of the autogyro
- Satish Dhawan (1920–2002)
- Walter Stuart Diehl (1893–1976) – created US Navy test facilities, authored Engineering Aerodynamics
- Bertil Dillner (1923–2015) – engineer at Saab and Boeing
- Paul Bernard Dilworth (1915–2007)
- Heini Dittmar (1911–1960) – record-breaking pilot
- Jurgis Dobkevičius (1900–1926) – Lithuanian aviation constructor, military pilot
- Takeo Doi (1904–1996) – designer for Kawasaki Aircraft Industries
- Tom Dolan – developed the lunar orbit rendezvous concept for the Apollo program
- Roy Dommett (1933–2015) – the United Kingdom's Chief Missile Scientist
- Charles J. Donlan (1916–2011) – NASA manager
- Allen F. Donovan (1914–1995) WW2 aircraft, Atlas and Titan missiles, nuclear rockets
- Jimmy Doolittle (1896–1993) – instrument flying developer
- Étienne Dormoy (1885–1959) – airplane and autogyro designer
- Claude Dornier (1884–1969)
- Anatoly Dorodnitsyn (1910–1994) – researched meteorology, vortex wing theory, boundary layer theory in a compressible gas, and supersonic gas dynamics
- Donald W. Douglas (1892–1981) – founder of the Douglas Aircraft Company
- George Dowty (1901–1975) – designer of aircraft components
- Charles Stark Draper (1901–1987) – developed inertial navigation
- Hugh Latimer Dryden (1898–1965) – researcher and NASA administrator
- Guy du Merle (1908–1993) – engineer, test flew captured Bf 109 and He 111 in Spain
- Alberto Santos Dumont (1873–1932) – inventor of the dirigible; aeronautics pioneer
- J. W. Dunne (1875–1949) – invented the first delta wing
- Pedro Duque (born 1963) – engineer and astronaut
- William F. Durand (1859–1958) – propeller designer, NACA chair
- Ludwig Dürr (1878–1956) – airship designer
- Leonid Dushkin (1910–1990) – rocket engine designer

== E ==
- George Edwards (1908–2003) – designer at Vickers-Armstrongs and BAC
- Alfred J. Eggers (1922–2006) – NACA / NASA researcher, developed re-entry bodies and compression lift, managed Pioneer program
- Joe Engle (1932–2024) – astronaut
- Robert Esnault-Pelterie (1881–1957) – aviation and rocketry pioneer, invented the center stick
- Walter Extra (born 1954) – aerobatic aircraft designer

== F ==
- Maxime Faget (1921–2004) – designer of the Project Mercury spacecraft
- Ole Fahlin (1901–1992) – propeller and prototype airplane developer
- Sherman Fairchild (1896–1971) – founded Fairchild Aircraft
- Charles Richard Fairey (1857–1956) – founder of the Fairey Aviation Company
- Farman Brothers
  - Richard Farman (1872–1940)
  - Henri Farman (1874–1958)
  - Maurice Farman (1877–1964)
- Robert W. Farquhar (1932–2015) – NASA engineer, inventor of the halo orbit
- Roy Fedden (1885–1973) – British engine designer for Bristol Engine Company
- Bobak Ferdowsi (born 1979) – JPL flight engineer
- Antonio Ferri (1912–1975) – created the Ferri scoop used on the jet intakes of the XF-103, F-105, XF8U-3, and SSM-N-9 Regulus II cruise missile, and the diverterless supersonic inlet used on the F-35
- Gerhard Fieseler (1896–1987) – German aircraft designer
- Harold Finger (born 1924) – Project NERVA lead engineer
- Gary Flandro (born 1934) – NASA researcher, conceived the Planetary Grand Tour fulfilled by the Voyager program
- Alexander H. Flax (1921–2014) – developer of tandem helicopters and reconnaissance satellites
- Anton Flettner (1885–1961) – helicopter pioneer
- Nicolas Florine (1891–1972) – helicopter pioneer
- James C. Floyd (born 1914) – Avro Canada designer
- Henrich Focke (1890–1979) – helicopter pioneer
- Anthony Fokker (1890–1939)
- Henry Folland (1889–1954) – chief designer at Nieuport, Gloster, and Folland Aircraft
- Edward Forman (1912–1973) – co-founder of JPL, Aerojet
- Robert L. Forward (1932–2002) – designer of solar sails and space tethers
- Harlan D. Fowler (1895–1982) – Fowler flap inventor
- John Fozard (1928–1996) – Hawker Siddeley Harrier designer
- Anselm Franz (1900–1994) – jet engine pioneer
- Stelio Frati (1919–2010) – designer of several aircraft inc the SIAI-Marchetti SF.260
- Leslie Frise (1895–1979) – designed the Type 156 Bristol Beaufighter
- John Carver Meadows Frost (1915–1979) – chief designer of the Avro Canada CF-100 and several VTOL projects
- Michimasa Fujino (born 1960) – Hondajet designer

== G ==
- Giuseppe Gabrielli (1903–1987) – aircraft designer
- Robert Gilruth (1913–2000) – engineer, NACA and NASA administrator
- Peter Glaser (1923–2014) – developed the solar power satellite
- John Glenn (1921–2016) – first American man to orbit the Earth in 1962
- Valentin Glushko (1908–1989)
- Robert Goddard (1882–1945) – scientist who developed the first liquid-fueled rocket 3-16-26
- Tadeusz Góra (1918–2010)
- Fritz Gosslau (1898–1965) – V-1 flying bomb designer
- Arthur Gouge (1890–1962) – designed the "C-class" Empire and Sunderland flying boats, invented the Gouge flap
- Granville Brothers – GeeBee racers
  - Zantford Granville
  - Thomas Granville
  - Robert Granville
  - Mark Granville
  - Edward Granville
- Jay Greene (1942–2017)
- Alan Arnold Griffith (1893–1963) – jet engine designer
- Gus Grissom (1926–1967) – Apollo 1 fire victim on January 27, 1967
- Gordon G. Grose (1925–1993) – integrated fly-by-wire controls with engine inlets/nozzles and advanced pilot displays
- Gu Songfen (born 1930) – participated in the design of the Shenyang JJ-1, chief designer of the Shenyang J-8 and Shenyang J-8II
- Guan De (1932–2018) – aeroelasticity engineer, participated in the design and development of the Shenyang JJ-1, the Shenyang J-8 and the Shenyang J-8II
- Leroy Grumman (1895–1982) – founder of Grumman Aircraft
- Tore Gullstrand (1921–2002) – chief engineer at Saab
- Siegfried and Walter Günter (1899–1969)(1899–1937) – jet aircraft pioneers
- Mikhail Gurevich (1893–1976) – co-founder of the OKB-155 MiG design bureau
- Bartolomeu de Gusmão (1685–1724) – Portuguese priest, aircraft designer
- Antanas Gustaitis (1898–1941) – Lithuanian aircraft designer, Brigadier General, Commander-in-Chief of Lithuanian Air Force

== H ==
- Wolfgang Haack (1902–1994)
- B. J. Habibie (1936–2019)
- Raoul Hafner (1905–1980) – helicopter pioneer
- Edward N. Hall (1914–2006) – Minuteman ICBM engineer
- Eugen Hänle (1924–1975) – sailplane designer
- Julius Hatry (1906–2000) – built the first rocket plane
- Harry Hawker (1889–1921) – test pilot, formed Hawker Aircraft
- Willis Hawkins (1913–2004) – design lead of the L-133 and C-130
- Clinton H. Havill (1892–1953) – researched airships and propellers
- Richard E. Hayden (born 1946) – noise reduction developer
- Wallace D. Hayes (1918–2001) – discoverer of the area rule and hypersonics
- Edward H. Heinemann (1908–1991) – Chief Engineer for Douglas Aircraft, designed 20 military aircraft
- Ernst Heinkel (1888–1958) – developed first jet rocket aircraft
- Chris Heintz (1938–2021) – kit plane designer
- Scarlin Hernandez (born 1991) – aerospace engineer for NASA’s James Webb Space Telescope
- Heinrich Hertel (1901–1982) – He 100, He 111, Do 635 designer
- Hall Hibbard (1903–1996) – Lockheed engineer
- Homer Hickam (born 1943) – NASA engineer, model rocketry enthusiast
- Geoffrey T. R. Hill (1895–1955) – designer of the Westland-Hill Pterodactyls and co-developed the aero-isoclinic wing
- Stanley Hiller (1924–2006) – founder Hiller Aircraft
- Hellmuth Hirth (1886–1938) – aircraft engine designer, brother of Wolf Hirth
- Wolf Hirth (1900–1959) – sailplane designer, brother of Hellmuth Hirth
- Leonard S. Hobbs (1896–1977) – engine designer
- John Hodge (1929–2021) – Avro Canada, NASA
- Sighard F. Hoerner (1906—1971) – aerodynamicist, assisted the Fieseler Fi 156 Storch design
- Nicholas J. Hoff (1906–1997)
- Samuel Kurtz Hoffman (1902–1995) – rocket engine designer
- Kurt Hohenemser (1906–2001) – helicopter pioneer
- Walter Hohmann (1880–1945) – invented the Hohmann transfer orbit
- Peter K. Homer (born 1961)
- Stanley Hooker (1907–1984) – British engine engineer for Rolls-Royce Aerospace
- Ralph Hooper (1926–2022) – Hawker Siddeley Harrier developer
- Jiro Horikoshi (1903–1982) – chief engineer for the Mitsubishi A6M
- Horten brothers – flying wing designers
  - Walter Horten (1913–1998)
  - Reimar Horten (1915–1994)
- John Houbolt (1919–2014) – NASA engineer, lunar orbit rendezvous proponent
- Kathleen Howell – known for her contributions to dynamical systems theory applied to spacecraft trajectory
- Hsue-Chu Tsien (1914–1997) – aeronautical engineer
- Howard Hughes (1905–1976) – aerospace engineer, owned RKO movie studio
- Huang Zhiqian (1914–1965) – lead designer of the Shenyang J-8
- Jerome Clarke Hunsaker (1886–1984) – pioneer of heavier and lighter than air aircraft
- Rick Husband (1957–2003) – died in the Columbia disaster
- François Hussenot (1912–1951) – inventor of one of the early forms of the flight recorder

== I ==
- Sergey Ilyushin (1894–1977) – founder of the OKB-39 Ilyushin design bureau
- Aleksei Isaev (1908–1971) – rocket engine designer
- Hideo Itokawa (1912–1999) – aircraft and rocket designer at Nakajima Aircraft Company
- Sergey Izotov (1917–1983) – aircraft engine designer, founder of the OKB-117 design bureau

== J ==
- Mary Jackson (1921–2005) – NASA engineer
- Eastman Jacobs (1902–1987) – advanced wind tunnels, airfoils, turbulence, boundary layers, and Schlieren photography
- Hans Jacobs (1907–1994) – sailplane pioneer
- Jack James (1920–2001) – Mariner program manager
- Antony Jameson (born 1934) – pioneered computational fluid dynamics
- Robert P. Johannes (1934–2004) – developed Fly-by-wire technology
- Clarence "Kelly" Johnson (1910–1990) – formed Lockheed's Skunk Works and led the design of the SR-71, U-2, F-117A, F-104, C-130, T-33, P-38, and Constellations
- Katherine Johnson (1918–2020) – mathematician who worked as an aerospace technologist at NASA
- Robert Thomas Jones (1910–1999) – aeronautical engineer at NASA
- Drago Jovanovich (1916–1983) – rotorcraft designer
- Charles Joy (1911–1989) – engineer at Armstrong Whitworth Aircraft, Gloster Aircraft Company. and Handley Page
- Hugo Junkers (1859–1935) – pioneered the design of all-metal airplanes

== K ==
- Rudolf Kaiser (1922–1991) – sailplane designer
- A. P. J. Abdul Kalam (1931–2015) – former President of India, "Missile Man of India"
- Charles Kaman (1919–2011) – helicopter pioneer
- Nikolai Kamov (1902–1973) – founder of the Kamov design bureau
- Abraham Karem (born 1937) – founder of UAV (drone) technology
- Alexander Kartveli (1896–1974) – Chief Engineer at Republic Aviation, contributor to first aerospace vehicle prototypes
- Otto Kauba (1908-1962) – designer of the Škoda-Kauba SK 257, co-designer of the Škoda-Kauba P14
- Harold R. Kaufman (1926-2018) – developed first ion thrusters
- David Keith-Lucas (1911–1997) – engineer at Short Brothers
- Mstislav Keldysh (1911–1978) – rocket and spacecraft designer
- W. Wallace Kellett (1891–1951) – Kellett Autogiro Corporation
- Thomas J. Kelly (1929–2002) – leader of the Apollo Lunar Module design team
- Benjamin S. Kelsey (1906–1981) – wrote specification for P-38 Lightning, P-39 Airacobra, drop tanks, served on X-15 committee
- Alexander Kemurdzhian (1921–2003) – mechanical engineer who is best known for designing Lunokhod 1, the first lunar rover
- Sergey Khristianovich (1908–2000) – aerodynamicist
- Dutch Kindelberger (1895–1962) – Chief Engineer at Douglas Aircraft and head of North American Aviation
- Klapmeier brothers (born 1958) (born 1961) – founders of Cirrus Aircraft
- Milton Klein (1924–2022) – nuclear rocket engineer
- Vladimir Yakovlevich Klimov (1892—1962) – aircraft engine designer, founder of the OKB-45 Klimov design bureau
- Ave K. Kludze, Jr. (born 1967?) – NASA engineer
- Heinz-Hermann Koelle (1925–2011) – von Braun associate
- Yuri Kondratyuk (1897–1942) – first developer of the lunar orbit rendezvous concept
- Otto C. Koppen (1901–1991) – MIT professor, designer for Ford and Helio Courier
- Yuri Koptev (born 1940) – engineer, former Roscosmos General Director
- Sergey Korolev (1907–1966) – Korolev rocket design bureau founder
- Semyon Kosberg (1903–1965) – lead engine designer at OKB-154
- Gleb Kotelnikov (1872–1944) – parachute pioneer
- Frank Kozloski (1916–2003) – rotorcraft and missile developer
- Chris Kraft (1924–2019) – NASA administrator
- Eugene Kranz (born 1933) – aeronautical engineer
- Werner Krüger (1910–2003) – inventor of the Krueger flap
- Dietrich Küchemann (1911–1976) – aerodynamicist
- Nikolai Dmitriyevich Kuznetsov (1911–1995) – engine designer, founder of the OKB-276 Kuznetsov design bureau

== L ==
- Gustav Lachmann (1896–1966) – designer at Handley-Page
- Barry Laight (1920–2012) – designer of the Blackburn Buccaneer
- Aarne Lakomaa (1914–2001) – involved in the design of the Saab 35 Draken and the Saab 37 Viggen
- Frederick W. Lanchester (1868–1946) – aerodynamicist
- Geoffrey A. Landis (born 1955) – NASA engineer, interplanetary exploration
- Samuel Pierpont Langley (1834–1906) – aircraft pioneer
- Agnew E. Larsen (1897–1969) – engineer at Curtiss and Pitcairn
- Conrad Lau (1921–1964) – lead designer of the XF8U-3 and A-7 Corsair
- Semyon Lavochkin (1900–1960) – founder of the OKB-301 Lavochkin design bureau
- Lovell Lawrence Jr. (1915–1971) – co-founder of Reaction Motors
- Bill Lear (1902–1978) – founder of Learjet
- Jerome F. Lederer (1902–2004) – aviation-safety pioneer
- René Leduc (1898–1968) – designer of the ramjet-powered Leduc 0.10
- Diane Lemaire (1923–2012) – first woman to graduate from the University of Melbourne with a degree in engineering
- Léon Levavasseur (1863–1922) – aviation pioneer
- David S. Lewis (1917–2003) – F-4 Phantom II program manager
- George W. Lewis (1882–1948) – NACA administrator
- Gordon Lewis (1924–2010) – turbine engine designer
- Fuk Li (born 1953) – JPL Mars Exploration Directorate manager
- Robert Lickley (1912–1998) – Chief Engineer at Fairey Aviation Company
- Robert H. Liebeck (1938–2026) – airfoil and blended wing body designer
- Otto Lilienthal (1848–1896)
- Charles Lindbergh (1902–1974) – made first solo transatlantic airplane flight from NY to Paris in 1927 on Spirit of St. Louis
- Per Lindstrand (born 1948) – balloons and other aircraft
- Alexander Lippisch (1894–1976)
- Claude Lipscomb (1887–1974) – designer of the Short Stirling
- Boris Lisunov (1898–1946) – engineered a copy of the DC-3
- William Littlewood – contributed to the design and operational requirements of transport aircraft
- Olof Ljungström (1918–2013) – engineer at Saab, taught aircraft design at Stanford University and Caltech
- Allan Lockheed (1889–1969) – co-founder of the Lockheed Corporation
- Malcolm Lockheed (1886–1958) – co-founder of the Lockheed Corporation
- Grover Loening (1888–1976) – awarded first ever degree in aeronautical engineering
- Robert Loewy (1926–2025) – rotor-wing VTOL aircraft designer
- Roy LoPresti (1929–2002) – general aviation designer
- Samuel Jasper Loring (1914–1963) – researched aeroelastic flutter problems
- George Low (1926–1984) – aerodynamicist and NASA administrator
- Gleb Lozino-Lozinskiy (1909–2001) – General Designer of the NPO Molniya design bureau, lead designer of the Buran space shuttle
- Lu Xiaopeng (1920–2000) – designer of the Nanchang Q-5 and the Nanchang J-12
- Heinrich Lübbe (1884–1940) – Anthony Fokker collaborator
- Glynn Lunney (1936–2021) – Apollo program
- Robert Lusser (1899–1969) – designer at Messerschmitt, Heinkel, and Fieseler
- Jean-Marie Luton (1942–2020) – ESA Director General
- Arkhip Lyulka (1908–1984) – engine designer, founder of the OKB-165 Lyulka design bureau
- Lev Lyulyev (1908–1985) – artillery, rocket, and missile designer, founder of the OKB-8 design bureau

== M ==
- Paul MacCready (1925–2007) – human-powered aircraft designer
- Elsie MacGill (1905–1980) – chief aeronautical engineer at Canadian Car and Foundry (CC&F)
- Ernst Mach (1838–1916) – physicist, studied shock waves
- Georg Hans Madelung (1889–1972) – V-1 designer
- Peyton M. Magruder (1911–1982) – lead designer of the Martin B-26
- Viktor Makeyev (1924–1985) – SLBM designer
- Frank Malina (1912–1981) – rocket engineer, JPL administrator
- John C. Mankins – NASA space-based solar power researcher
- Frank E. Marble (1918–2014)
- Frederick Marriott (1805–1884)
- Glenn L. Martin (1886–1955) – founder of the Glenn L. Martin Company
- Hans Mauch (1906–1984) – jet engine pioneer, artificial limb developer
- Mark D. Maughmer (born 1950) – aerodynamicist
- Owen Maynard (1924–2000) – Avro Canada, NASA
- William C. McCool (1961–2003) – died in the Columbia disaster
- James Smith McDonnell (1899–1980) – founder of McDonnell Aircraft Corporation
- Colin R. McInnes (born 1968) – solar sail researcher
- Marion O. McKinney Jr. (1921–1999) – NACA and NASA engineer, researched VTOL flight
- William B. McLean (1914–1976) – lead designer of the AIM-9 Sidewinder air-to-air missile
- George J. Mead (1891–1949) – engine designer
- William C. Mentzer (1907–1971) – contributed to aircraft maintenance and economics
- Wilhelm Messerschmitt (1898–1978) – designed Bf 109 and jet powered Me 262
- Artem Mikoyan (1905–1970) – co-founder of the OKB-155 MiG design bureau
- Mikhail Mil (1909–1970) – founder and general designer of the OKB-329 Mil design bureau
- Alexander Mikulin (1895–1985) – engine designer, founded the OKB-24 Mikulin design bureau
- Frederick George Miles (1903–1976) – designer at Miles Aircraft, husband of Maxine Blossom Miles
- John W. Miles (1920–2008) – pioneer in theoretical fluid mechanics
- Maxine Blossom Miles (1901–1984) – pilot, designer, draughtswoman, aerodynamicist and stress engineer, designer of the Miles Hawk
- Clark Blanchard Millikan (1903–1966) – professor of aeronautics
- Arseny Mironov (1917–2019) – Russian scientist, aerospace engineer and aircraft pilot
- Don Mitchell (1915–1993) – sailplane designer
- R. J. Mitchell (1895–1937) – designed the Spitfire aircraft
- Swati Mohan – Mars 2020 engineer
- Paul Moller (born 1936) – circular aircraft designer
- Montgolfier brothers (1740–1810) (1745–1799) – inventors of the hot air balloon
- John J. Montgomery (1858–1911)
- Al Mooney (1906–1986) – general aviation designer
- Hans Moravec (born 1948) – space tether developer
- Morien Morgan (1912–1978) – 'Father of the Concorde'
- George Mueller (1918–2015) – NASA administrator
- Tom Mueller (born 1961) – SpaceX Engineer & Impulse Space Founder
- Alan Mulally (born 1945) – Boeing executive and President of Ford
- Hans Multhopp (1913–1972)
- Elon Musk (born 1971) – founder of SpaceX and co-founder of Tesla
- Vladimir Mikhailovich Myasishchev (1902–1978) – founder of the OKB-23 Myasishchev design bureau

== N ==
- Aleksandr Nadiradze (1914–1987) – Soviet Georgian ballistic missile and rocket engineer
- James C. Nance (1927–2019) – aircraft nuclear propulsion engineer
- Gerhard Neumann (1917–1997) – engineer for General Electric, contributed to the design of the J79
- Édouard Nieuport (1875–1911) – aviation pioneer
- No Kum-sok aka Kenneth H. Rowe (1932–2022) – North Korean MiG-15 pilot defector, US aeronautical engineer and professor
- Umberto Nobile (1885–1978) – semi-rigid airship designer
- Desmond Norman (1929–2002) - co-designer of the Britten-Norman BN-2 Islander
- John Dudley North (1893–1968) – chief engineer at Boulton Paul Aircraft
- Robert B. C. Noorduyn (1893–1959) – Noorduyn Norseman designer
- Jack Northrop (1895–1981) – founded Northrop Corporation in 1939 and later the Flying Wing
- Genrikh Novozhilov (1925–2019) – key designer of multiple Ilyushin passenger aircraft

== O ==
- Hermann Oberth (1894–1989) – rocketry pioneer
- William C. Ocker (1880–1942) – instrument flying pioneer
- Wendy Okolo (born 1984?) – NASA engineer
- Gerard K. O'Neill (1927–1992) – developer of the O'Neill cylinder for space colonization

== P ==
- Frederick Page (1917–2005) – lead designer of the English Electric Lightning and the BAC TSR-2
- Mark Page (born 1956) – blended wing body and UAV designer
- Thomas O. Paine (1921–1992) – engineer, scientist, NASA administrator
- Paul C. Paris (1930–2017) – known for introducing fracture mechanics to the aviation industry
- Bob Parkinson (born 1941) – HOTOL spaceplane developer
- Jack Parsons (1914–1952) – rocket engineer, chemist, JPL founder
- Luigi Pascale (1923–2017) – founder and lead designer for the light aircraft firms Partenavia and Tecnam
- Pedro Paulet (c. 1874–1945) – rocketry pioneer
- Vladimir Pavlecka (1901–1980) – invented flush rivets, designed the ZMC-2 rigid airship and pressurized transports
- Nicolas Roland Payen (1914–2004) – delta wing developer
- Richard Pearse (1877–1953) – early New Zealand aircraft builder
- Jerome Pearson (1938–2021) – space elevator developer
- George Edward Pendray (1901–1987) – co-founder of Reaction Motors
- Harald Penrose (1904–1996) – test pilot and glider designer
- Edgar Percival (1897–1984) – founder of the Percival Aircraft Company
- Bruce Peterson (1933–2006) – NASA engineer and test pilot
- Anatoly Perminov (born 1945) – former Roscosmos General Director
- Vladimir Petlyakov (1891–1942) – founder of the Petlyakov design bureau
- W. E. W. (Teddy) Petter (1908–1968) – designer at Westland, English Electric, and Folland
- Frank Piasecki (1919–2008) – helicopter pioneer
- William Hayward Pickering (1910–2004) – rocketry pioneer, JPL director
- Rex Pierson (1891–1948) – chief designer of the Vickers Wellington
- Percy Pilcher (1867–1899)
- Harold Frederick Pitcairn (1897–1960) – autogyro developer
- Curtis Pitts (1915–2005)
- Paul Poberezny (1921–2013) – founder of the Experimental Aircraft Association
- Mikhail Pogosyan (born 1956) – general director of Sukhoi and United Aircraft Corporation
- Hermann Pohlmann (1894–1991) – designer of the Ju 87 Stuka
- Nikolai Polikarpov (1892–1944) – founded the Polikarpov design bureau
- Boris Popov – invented one of the first successful aircraft ballistic parachute systems
- Henry Potez (1891–1981)
- Herman Potočnik (1892–1929)
- Ludwig Prandtl (1875–1953)
- Ronald F. Probstein (1928–2021) – researched hypersonics including re-entry vehicle design
- Ralph V. Pruitt (1936–1983) – integrated fly-by-wire controls with engine inlets/nozzles and advanced pilot displays
- Palmer Cosslett Putnam (1900–1984) – wind-power pioneer

== Q ==
- Qian Xuesen (1911–2009)

== R ==
- Arthur Emmons Raymond (1899–1999) – lead designer of the DC-3
- R. Dale Reed (1930–2005) – NASA lifting body designer
- Wendell E. Reed (c.1924-2005) – developed jet engine controls
- Wilfrid Thomas Reid (1887–1968)
- Frederick Rentschler (1887–1956) – aircraft engine designer
- Judith Resnik (1949–1986)
- Osborne Reynolds (1842–1912)
- Richard V. Rhode (1904–1994) – researched aerodynamic loading
- Ben Rich (1925–1995) – director of Lockheed's Skunk Works; contributed to SR-71 and F-117 development
- G. Tilghman Richards (1884–1960) – annular wing designer
- John M. Riebe (1921–2011)
- Norbert Riedel (1912–1963) – developed jet engine starting motors
- Robert brothers (1758–1820) (1760–1820) – balloonists
- Tecwyn Roberts (1925–1988) – Avro Canada, NASA
- Frank D. Robinson (1930–2022) – helicopter designer
- Alliott Verdon Roe (1877–1956)
- Francis Rogallo (1912–2009) – NASA engineer, created the Rogallo wing which led to hang-gliding
- Gertrude Rogallo (1914–2008) – wife and collaborator of Francis Rogallo
- Frank E. Rom (1926–2012) – NASA nuclear propulsion engineer
- Stuart Roosa (1933–1994) – astronaut
- Harold Rosen (1926–2017) – electrical engineer known as "the father of the geostationary satellite"
- Milton Rosen (1915–2014) – lead designer of the Vanguard rocket
- Jan Roskam (1930–2022)
- Ludwig Roth (1909–1967)
- Carlo Rubbia (born 1934) – fission-fragment rocket proposer
- Edward J. Ruppelt (1923–1960) – director of Project Blue Book
- Archibald Russell (1904–1995) – designed the Concorde, Blenheim, Britannia, and Type 188
- Burt Rutan (born 1943) – airplane and spacecraft designer
- Tubal Claude Ryan (1898–1982) – founder of the Ryan Aeronautical Company
- Yuri Alekseevich Ryzhov (1930–2017) – aerodynamicist

== S ==
- Friedrich Wilhelm Sander (1885–1938) – pyrotechnics and rocket technology engineer
- Eugen Sänger (1905–1964) – spaceplane designer
- Irene Sänger-Bredt (1911–1983) – wife and collaborator of Eugen Sänger
- George S. Schairer (1913–2004) – lead designer at Consolidated and Boeing
- Helmut Schelp (1912–1994) – jet engine pioneer
- Alexander Schleicher (1901–1968) – sailplane designer
- Paul Schmidt (1898–1976) – V-1 engine designer
- Edgar Schmued (1899–1985) – lead engineer on the P-51, F-86, F-100, F-5, T-38
- Edmund Schneider (1901-1968) – glider designer including the Schneider Grunau Baby
- Raemer Schreiber (1910–1998) – nuclear rocket engine designer
- Bernard Schriever (1910–2005) – managed ICBM development
- Schweizer brothers – sailplane designers
  - Paul Schweizer (1913–2004)
  - William Schweizer (1917–2016)
  - Ernest Schweizer (1912–2000)
- William T. Schwendler (1904-1978) – co-founder of Grumman Aircraft Engineering Corporation
- Robert Seamans (1918–2008) – engineer, NACA and NASA administrator
- William R. Sears (1913–2002) – flying wing designer
- Ernest Edwin Sechler (1905–1979) – researched thin-shell structures
- Anita Sengupta – led the JPL team that designed the Curiosity Mars rover parachute system
- Lucien Servanty (1909–1973) – SO.6000 Triton and Concorde designer
- Alexander P. de Seversky (1894–1974) – founder of Seversky Aircraft, later Republic Aviation
- Joseph Francis Shea (1925–1999) – NASA Administrator for the Apollo Program
- Beatrice Shilling (1909–1990) – perfected the carburetor on the Rolls-Royce Merlin engine
- Leonid Shkadov (1927–2003) – aircraft development and optimization engineer
- Nevil Shute (1899–1960) – aeronautical engineer and author
- Arkady Shvetsov (1892–1953) – chief engine designer at the OKB-19 design bureau
- Igor Sikorsky (1889–1972) – pioneered helicopters
- Ozires Silva (born 1931) – founder of Embraer
- Abe Silverstein (1908–2001) – engineer, NACA and NASA administrator
- Apollo M. O. Smith (1911–1997) – Douglas D-558-1 Skystreak, F3D, and F4D designer, pioneer in computational fluid dynamics
- Herbert Smith (1889–1977) – designer of the Sopwith Triplane
- John Maynard Smith (1920–2004) – military aircraft designer, later evolutionary biologist and geneticist
- Joseph Smith (1897–1956) – designer at Supermarine
- Ted R. Smith (1906–1976) – designer of the Aero Commander and Aerostar
- Pavel Solovyov (1917–1996) – chief engine designer at the OKB-19 design bureau
- Song Wencong (1930–2016) – lead designer of the Chengdu J-10
- Thomas Sopwith (1888–1989) – Sopwith Aviation Company
- Tony Spear (1937-2024) – Mars Pathfinder project manager
- Percival H. Spencer (1897–1995) – designer of the Republic RC-3 Seabee
- Dorothy Spicer (1908–1946) – aeronautical engineer
- Reginald Stafford (1903–1980) – designer of the Handley Page Victor
- John Stack (1906–1972) – Bell X-1 designer
- Lloyd Stearman (1898–1975) – founder of Stearman Aircraft
- Adam Steltzner (born 1963) – JPL engineer for Mars rovers' entry, descent, and landing
- Alan Stern (born 1957) – engineer and planetary scientist, principal investigator of the New Horizons mission to Pluto
- Homer Joseph Stewart (1915–2007) – helped develop Explorer 1, Pioneer 4, and several rockets
- Edward Stinson (1893–1932) – founder of the Stinson Aircraft Company
- Luigi Stipa (1900–1992) – invented the "intubed propeller"
- Harrison Storms (1915–1992) – directed North American Aviation's Apollo Program
- William Bushnell Stout (1880–1956) – Ford Trimotor designer
- Michael Stroukoff (1883-1973) – designer of the Fairchild C-123 Provider
- Ernst Stuhlinger (1913–2008) – ion engine developer
- Pavel Sukhoi (1895–1975) – founded the OKB-51 Sukhoi design bureau
- Martin Summerfield (1916–1996) - co-founder of Aerojet
- Sun Cong (born 1961) - chief designer of the FC-31 and Shenyang J-15
- Joe Sutter (1921–2016) – chief engineer for the Boeing 747
- Ed Swearingen (1925–2014) – general aviation designer
- Clarence Syvertson (1926–2010) – NACA / NASA researcher, developed sounding rockets, compression lift, lifting bodies
- Victor Szebehely (1921–1977) – aerospace engineering and celestial mechanics

== T ==
- Max Taitz (1904–1980) – scientist in aerodynamics and flight testing of aircraft, one of the founders of Gromov Flight Research Institute
- Kurt Tank (1898–1983) – designer of aircraft in Germany, Argentina, and India
- Clarence Gilbert Taylor (1898–1988) – designer of the Piper Cub
- Moulton Taylor (1912–1965) – experimental aircraft pioneer
- Peter Theisinger (1945–2024) – JPL Mars Exploration Rover project manager
- Theodore Theodorsen (1897–1978) – aerodynamicist at NACA
- Richard G. Thomas (1930–2006) – aeronautical engineer and test pilot
- Mikhail Tikhonravov (1900–1974) – rocket and spacecraft pioneer
- Milton Orville Thompson (1926–1993) – NASA engineer and test pilot
- Grigori Tokaty (1909–2003) – rocket engineer
- Alessandro Tonini (1885–1932) – designer at Gabardini, Macchi, and IMAM
- Myron Tribus (1921–2016) – deicer developer, heat transfer researcher
- Robert Truax (1917–2010) – Aerojet engineer, designer of the Sea Dragon heavy launch vehicle
- Richard Truly (1937–2024) – former astronaut and head of NASA
- Konstantin Tsiolkovsky (1857–1935) – rocketry pioneer
- Tu Jida (1927–2011) – participated in the development of the Shenyang JJ-1, chief designer of the Nanchang CJ-6, Shenyang J-5A, Chengdu JJ-5, and several variants of the J-7 fighter, including the Chengdu J-7M
- Sergey Tumansky (1901–1973) – engine designer, founder of the OKB-300 Tumansky design bureau
- Andrei Tupolev (1888–1972) – founder of the OKB-156 Tupolev design bureau

== U ==
- Dana Ulery (born 1938) – JPL scientist, automated tracking of deep space probes
- Ralph Hazlett Upson (1888–1968) – designed the world's only all-metal stressed-skin airship
- Oskar Ursinus (1877–1952) – sailplane designer

== V ==
- Max Valier (1895–1930) – rocketry pioneer
- Sitaram Rao Valluri (1924–2019) – researched metal fatigue
- Kermit Van Every (1915–1998) – high-speed aircraft designer, Douglas Aircraft
- Richard VanGrunsven (born 1939) – prolific kit aircraft engineer
- Vandi Verma – JPL robot engineer
- Vladimir Vetchinkin (1888–1950) – aerodynamicist
- Walter G. Vincenti (1917–2019) – hypersonic aircraft designer
- Aurel Vlaicu (1882–1913)
- Richard Vogt (1894–1979) – designer of asymmetrical aircraft
- Gabriel Voisin (1880–1973) – aviation pioneer
- George Volkert (1891–1978) – designed the Handley-Page Halifax
- Wernher von Braun (1912–1977) – German rocket pioneer
- Theodore von Kármán (1881–1963)
- Hans von Ohain (1911–1998)
- Fritz von Opel (1899–1971) – rocketry pioneer
- Chance M. Vought (1890–1930) – founder of Vought Aircraft
- Traian Vuia (1872–1950) – first flight with no other ground devices
- Gerard Vultee (1900-1938) – engineer, founder of Vultee Aircraft

== W ==
- Lawrence Wackett (1896–1982) – "father of the Australian aircraft industry", lead designer of the CAC Boomerang
- Gerhard Waibel (born 1938) – sailplane designer
- Dwane Wallace (1911–1989) – early Cessna CEO and designer
- Richard Walker (1900–1982) – main designer for jet aircraft of Gloster Aircraft Company
- Barnes Wallis (1887–1979)
- Ken Wallis (1916–2013) – autogyro
- Hellmuth Walter (1900–1980) – rocket engines
- Frid Wänström (1905–1988) – engineer, head of calculations at Saab
- Joseph F. Ware Jr. (1916–2012) – Lockheed engineer and test pilot
- Edward Pearson Warner (1894–1958) – NACA research engineer
- Kyūichirō Washizu (1921–1981) – lead designer of the Yokosuka MXY-7 Ohka kamikaze rocket plane
- Frank Wattendorf (1906–1986) – von Karman assistant, wind tunnel designer
- Johanna Weber (1910–2014) – aerodynamicist for the Handley-Page Victor and Concorde
- Fred Weick (1899–1993) – airmail pilot, NACA research engineer who designed the NACA cowl, and designer of the Ercoupe and Piper Cherokee
- Daniel Weihs (born 1942)
- Edward Curtis Wells (1910–1986) – Boeing executive and designer
- Ted A. Wells (1907–1991) – co-founder of Beech Aircraft Corporation
- Michael J. Wendl (born 1934) – developed terrain following technology, energy management theory, and integrated fly-by-wire controls with engine inlets/nozzles and advanced pilot displays
- Günter Wendt (1924–2010) – McDonnell Aircraft and North American Aviation engineer; pad leader, prepared all crewed Mercury, Gemini, and Apollo spacecraft
- Kenneth Wernicke (1932–2022) – Bell tiltrotor designer
- Alexander Weygers (1901–1989) – discopter designer
- Ray Wheeler (1927–2019) – Saunders-Roe designer of rockets and hovercraft
- Orville A. Wheelon (1906–1966) – invented the Verson-Wheelon process for aircraft sheet-metal forming, introduced titanium fabrication
- Richard Whitcomb (1921–2009) – NACA/NASA inventor of the area rule, supercritical airfoil, and winglet
- Ed White (1930–1967) – Apollo 1 fire victim on January 27, 1967
- Gustave Whitehead (1874–1927) – aviation pioneer
- Frank Whittle (1907–1996) – pioneer of the jet engine
- Michel Wibault (1897–1963) – invented vectored thrust
- Robert H. Widmer (1916–2011) – lead designer on the B-36, B-58, F-111, and F-16
- Sheila Widnall (born 1938) – fluid mechanics researcher
- Stanisław Wigura (1901–1932)
- Geoff Wilde (1917–2007) – Rolls-Royce engine designer
- Heather Willauer (born 1974) – United States Naval Research Laboratory researcher of jet fuel manufacture from seawater
- Oswald S. Williams Jr. (1921–2005)
- Sam B. Williams (1921–2009) – small fanjet engine developer
- Thornton Wilson (1921–1999) – B-47, B-52, and Minuteman missile designer
- Steve Wittman (1904–1995) – air-racer and aircraft designer
- Hans Wocke (1908-post 1967) – designed forward-swept wing jet aircraft
- Julian Wolkovitch (1932–1991) – promoted the closed wing
- Homer J. Wood – auxiliary power unit designer
- Pete Worden (born 1949) – NASA director
- Wright brothers (1871–1948) (1867–1912) – made first powered airplane flight on Dec 17, 1903 at Kitty Hawk, NC
- Theodore Paul Wright (1895–1970) – engineer and administrator
- Georg Wulf (1895–1927) – aviation pioneer
- James Hart Wyld (1912–1954) – co-founder of Reaction Motors, designed the rocket engines for the Bell X-1 and RTV-A-2 Hiroc

== X ==
- Xu Shunshou (1917–1968) – oversaw the development of the Shenyang JJ-1 and participated in the design of the Nanchang CJ-6, the Nanchang Q-5, and the Xian H-6, died from mistreatment during the Cultural Revolution

== Y ==
- Alexander Sergeyevich Yakovlev (1906–1989) – founder of the OKB-115 Yakovlev design bureau
- Mikhail Yangel (1911–1971) – founder of the OKB-586 design bureau
- Ye Zhengda (1927–2017) – participated in the design of the Shenyang JJ-1
- Chuck Yeager (1923–2020) – test pilot and first to break the sound barrier
- Vladimir Yermolaev (1909–1944) – lead designer at OKB-240
- Ed Yost (1919–2007) – developer of the modern hot air balloon
- Arthur M. Young (1905–1995) – designer of the first Bell helicopter

== Z ==
- Albert Francis Zahm (1862–1954) – aeronautical experimenter and chief of the Aeronautical Division of the U.S. Library of Congress
- Stephen Joseph Zand (1898–1963) – solved many early aviation vibrations problems
- Friedrich Zander (1887–1933) – rocket designer, solar sail and gavitational assist developer
- Filippo Zappata (1894–1994) – worked for Gabardini, Cantieri Riuniti dell'Adriatico (CANT), Blériot, Breda, and Agusta
- Engelbert Zaschka (1895–1955) – one of the first German helicopter pioneers
- Helmut Zborowski (1905–1969) – rocket and VTOL designer
- Ferdinand von Zeppelin (1838–1917) – airship designer
- Nikolay Zhukovsky (1847–1921) – researcher
- Henri Ziegler (1906–1998) – father of the Airbus program
- Charles H. Zimmerman (1908–1996) – experimental aircraft designer, designed the Vought XF5U "flying pancake" and invented a kinesthetic theory of control that led to the VZ-1 Pawnee flying platform
- Robert Zubrin (born 1952) – Mars Society founder, designer of the theoretical nuclear salt-water rocket
- Fritz Zwicky (1898–1974) – astronomer, patented several jet engine features

== See also ==
- Boeing School of Aeronautics § Notable students
- List of Germans relocated to the US via the Operation Paperclip
- List of Russian aerospace engineers
- List of SETP members (test pilots)
- Project Orion (nuclear propulsion) § Notable personnel
