= Daniel Guggenheim Medal =

American engineering award

- Awarded for: Innovators who make notable achievements in the advancement of aeronautics
- Sponsored by: AIAA, ASME, SAE International, and Vertical Flight Society
- Country: International
- Reward: Medal
- First award: 1929
- Final award: 2026
- Website: http://www.guggenheimmedal.org

The Daniel Guggenheim Medal is an American engineering award, established by Daniel and Harry Guggenheim. The medal is considered to be one of the greatest honors that can be presented for a lifetime of work in aeronautics. Its first recipient was Orville Wright. Other recipients have included American and international individuals from aeronautical corporations, governments, and academia.

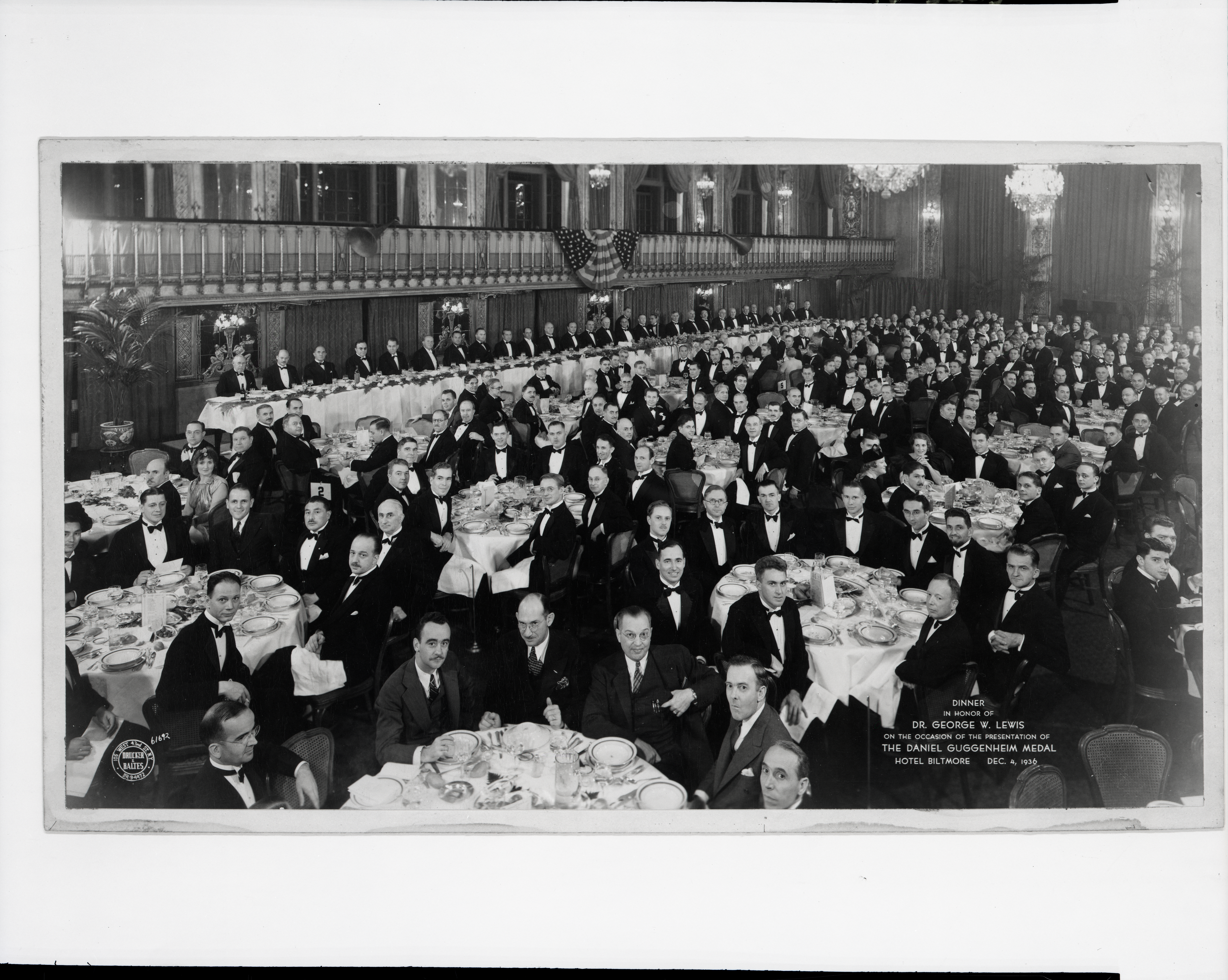
Dinner in honor of George W. Lewis for the Daniel Guggenheim medal

Since 1929 it has been given annually to persons who make notable achievements in the advancement of aeronautics. It is awarded jointly by the American Society of Mechanical Engineers, the Society of Automotive Engineers, the American Helicopter Society, and the American Institute of Aeronautics and Astronautics. The American Institute of Aeronautics and Astronautics administers the award.

== Physical Description ==
Obverse: Spirit of St. Louis, a hot air balloon, and the nose of airship over sun burst and clouds depicted in relief; raised text on outer ring surrounding relief.

Reverse: Three stylized bird wings surrounding raised letters and inscribed text.

Dimensions (diameter x depth): 6.4 × 0.5cm (2 1/2 × 3/16 in.)

== Recipients ==
The winners are listed below along with their award citation and year.

Year	Name	Award citation	Reference
1929	Orville Wright	For the design and construction, with his brother now deceased, of the first successful engine-propelled airplane.	
1930	Ludwig Prandtl	For pioneer and creative work in the theory of dynamics.	
1931	Frederick W. Lanchester	For contributions to the fundamental theory of aerodynamics.	
1932	Juan de la Cierva	For development of the theory and practice of the autogiro.	
1933	Jerome Clarke Hunsaker	For contributions to the science of aerodynamics, to the science and art of aircraft design, and to the practical construction and utilization of rigid airships.	
1934	William E. Boeing	For successful pioneering and achievement in aircraft manufacturing and air transport.	
1935	William F. Durand	For notable achievement as pioneer in laboratory research and theory of aeronautics; distinguished contributions to the theory and development of aircraft propellers.	
1936	George W. Lewis	For pioneer and creative work in the theory of dynamics.	
1937	Hugo Eckener	For notable contributions to transoceanic air transport and to international cooperation in aeronautics.	
1938	Alfred H. Fedden	For contributions to the development of aircraft engine design and for the specific design of the sleeve-valve aircraft engine.	
1939	Donald W. Douglas	For outstanding contributions to the design and construction of transport airplanes.	
1940	Glenn L. Martin	For contributions to aeronautical development and the production of many types of aircraft of high performance.	
1941	Juan T. Trippe	For the development and successful operation of oceanic air transport.	
1942	James H. Doolittle	For notable achievements in the advancements of both the art and the science of aeronautics.	
1943	Edmund T. "Eddie" Allen	For major contributions to aeronautics leading to important advances in airplane design, flight research, and airline operation; particularly for the presentation of new methods for operational control and for the development of scientific and systematic methods in the flight testing of aircraft for basic design and performance data.	
1944	Lawrence D. Bell	For achievement in design and construction of military air craft and for outstanding contributions to the methods of production.	
1945	Theodore P. Wright	For outstanding contributions to the development of civil and military aircraft, and for notable achievement in assuring the success of our wartime aircraft production program.	
1946	Frank Whittle	For pioneering the development of turbojet propulsion of aircraft.	
1947	Lester Durand Gardner	For outstanding achievement in advancing aeronautics, particularly for his conception and organization of the Institute of the Aeronautical Sciences.	
1948	Leroy R. Grumman	For outstanding achievement in successfully advancing aircraft design, both for Naval and peacetime use.	
1949	Edward Pearson Warner	For pioneering in research and a continuous record of contributions to the art and science of aeronautics.	
1950	Hugh L. Dryden	For outstanding leadership in aeronautical research and fundamental contributions to aeronautical science.	
1951	Igor I. Sikorsky	For a lifetime of outstanding contributions to aeronautics, including pioneering with multi-engine airplanes, flying boats, amphibians and helicopters.	
1952	Geoffrey de Havilland	For forty years of pioneering in military and commercial aircraft and the development of long-range jet transport.	
1953	Charles Lindbergh	For pioneering achievements in flight and air navigation.	
1954	Clarence D. Howe	For initiating and organizing commercial air routes and services, promoting aeronautical research, development and production of aircraft and engines, and advancing the art of aeronautics.	
1955	Theodore von Karman	For long-continued leadership in the development of aerodynamic theory and its application to the practical problems of flight, in education in the aeronautical sciences, and in stimulating international cooperation in aeronautical research.	
1956	Frederick B. Rentschler	For a wide range of major achievements throughout a lifetime devoted to aviation, with specific reference to his many notable contributions to the vital aircraft engine field	
1957	Arthur E. Raymond	For the development of a long line of successful civil and military aircraft and for notable contributions to aeronautics in public service.	
1958	William Littlewood	For leadership and continuous personal participation over a quarter of a century in developing the equipment and operating techniques of air transport.	
1959	George Edwards	For a lifetime devoted to the design of military and commercial aircraft, culminating in the successful introduction into worldwide commercial service of the first turbine-powered propeller-driven aircraft.	
1960	Grover Loening	For a lifetime devoted to the development of aeronautics in America.	
1961	Jerome F. Lederer	For his lifelong dedication to the cause of flight safety and his constant and untiring efforts to reduce the hazards of aviation.	
1962	James H. Kindelberger	For technical and industrial leadership in producing excellent aircraft and space equipment, from early fighters to the X-15 space plane.	
1963	James S. McDonnell	For lifetime contribution of outstanding nature in the design and development of military aircraft, and for pioneer work in space technology.	
1964	Robert H. Goddard	For pioneering in rocket development and astronautics, including the first liquid-propelled rocket flight, and contributions toward aero-dynamically applicable reaction engines.	
1965	Sydney Camm	For over fifty years of continuous dedication to the design of military aircraft, and pioneering of many new concepts and the creation of many successful aircraft representative of the best tradition of British design skills.	
1966	Charles S. Draper	For contributions to aeronautical education and significant developments in new fields of aircraft instrumentation, in particular for pioneering inertial- guidance techniques making possible en route navigation independently of earth references; for over twenty-five years of leadership in the technology of control and guidance of flight vehicles, and with the training of a large number of engineers in this vital field of aeronautics and astronautics.	
1967	George S. Schairer	For his many contributions to the achievement of outstanding progress in subsonic/light, and in the promise of supersonic flight, and in the equipment and methods for space exploration.	
1968	H. M. Horner	For his lifelong dedication and significant contributions to the advancement of modern aviation through the development and production of an outstanding series of aircraft powerplants and spacecraft propulsion engines.	
1969	H. Julian Allen	For outstanding courage, leadership and pioneering foresight that contributed outstandingly to civil and military aviation, including the evolution of the jet transport; and for his broad counsel and support to government and industry during a distinguished career.	
1970	Jakob Ackeret	For original and outstanding contributions to aerodynamics, aviation and engineering education.	
1971	Archibald Russell	For his personal devotion and many contributions to aircraft engineering and design and particularly for his outstanding leadership of the Bristol team in the development of the Anglo-French Concorde Supersonic Transport Aircraft.	
1972	William C. Mentzer	For manifold accomplishments in airline engineering, maintenance and economic disciplines, which accomplishments contributed significantly to the achievement of today’s civil air transportation systems.	
1973	William M. Allen	For outstanding courage, leadership and pioneering foresight that contributed outstandingly to civil and military aviation, including the evolution of the jet transport; and for his broad counsel and support to government and industry during a distinguished career.	
1974	Floyd L. Thompson	For farsighted development of men and facilities and for decisive leadership of research that provided technological foundations for manned flight beyond the speed of sound, safe re-entry of spacecraft, and successful exploration of space.	
1975	Dwane L. Wallace	For his many engineering, management and leadership contributions in the development of general aviation from a novelty forty years ago to a key part of the world’s transportation system today.	
1976	Marcel Dassault	For notable achievement in development, production and marketing of many types of aircraft of high performance and outstanding leadership in world aviation.	
1977	Cyrus R. Smith	For lifetime contribution of outstanding nature in the design and development of military aircraft, and for pioneer work in space technology.	
1978	Edward H. Heinemann	For outstanding achievement in the innovative design of military airplanes which are noted for longevity of service, versatility of tasks, simplicity of design, high performance and elegance of line.	
1979	Gerhard Neumann	For the development of highly efficient aircraft engines for commercial and military purposes, including creation of one of the first successful turbofan engines which contributed significantly to the efficiency and success of the airline industry.	
1980	Edward Curtis Wells	For his outstanding contributions to the management concepts for the development of complex aerospace systems, and for his significant personal accomplishments in the design and production of a long line of the world’s most famous commercial and military aircraft.	
1981	Clarence Johnson	For his brilliant design of a wide range of pace-setting, commercial, combat and reconnaissance aircraft, and for his innovative management techniques which developed these aircraft in record time at minimum cost.	
1982	David S. Lewis Jr.	For his long-standing contributions to aviation and national defense, and his untiring efforts toward the development of superior aircraft.	
1983	Nicholas J. Hoff	For a lifetime of significant contributions to the theory and practice of aeronautical structures design as an outstanding engineering scholar and educator.	
1984	Thomas H. Davis	For outstanding achievements in the development of an airline, of unique general aviation services; and of personnel training techniques, accomplished continuously during a period of more than 40 years.	
1985	Thornton Wilson	For a lifetime contribution to the successful development of commercial and military aircraft and for his outstanding leadership and management skills.	
1986	Hans W. Liepmann	For outstanding leadership in fluid mechanics research and education. His influence contributed significantly to the development of a generation of outstanding leaders in the field.	
1987	Paul B. MacCready	For his combination of high-flying gossamer vision and down-to-earth engineering skill which made the ancient dream of human powered flight come true, and for his contemporary imagination in recreating the ancient pterodactyl, Quetzalcoatl’s Northropi.	
1988	J. R. D. Tata	For a lifetime of significant contributions to aviation, for his pioneering work in developing commercial air travel in India and Asia, and for his leadership in establishing Air India as a major international link between Asia and the rest of the world.	
1989	Fred E. Weick	For development of the NACA cowl and the steerable tricycle landing gear which resulted in significant improvement in practical aircraft design and performance.	
1990	Joseph F. Sutter	For outstanding engineering achievement, management and leadership in the innovative development of three generations of commercial jet aircraft — in particular the 747 — and his contribution to the enhancement of safety in air and space.	
1991	Hans P. von Ohain	For pioneering the development of turbojet propulsion resulting in the first flight of a jet-powered aircraft in 1939 and his lifetime achievements in aeronautical propulsion dynamics.	
1992	Bernard L. Koff	For continuing leadership in the aircraft gas turbine industry producing many innovative and technological breakthroughs in material and design.	
1993	Ludwig Boelkow	For visionary leadership and innovation in the design of rotorcraft, light aircraft, missiles and space systems.	
1994	Helmut H. Korst	For a legacy of developments in aeronautics where none previously existed; for mentoring a cascade of students and colleagues dedicated to the art and science of fluid mechanics and for a lifetime of inspiration and leadership to the international engineering community.	
1995	Robert C. Seamans	For lifelong technical contributions and technical leadership in academia, industry and government as NASA Deputy Administrator during the Apollo program and in several other government positions.	
1996	William R. Sears	For lifelong contributions to aeronautics in industry and academia from the aerodynamics of the flying wing to the invention of the adaptive wind tunnel.	
1997	Abe Silverstein	For technical contributions and visionary leadership in advancing the technology of aircraft and propulsion performance, and for the foresight in establishing the Mercury and Gemini manned space flight activities.	
1998	Richard Coar	For outstanding leadership and innovative contributions in providing advanced aeronautical and space propulsion systems.	
1999	Frank E. Marble	For major fundamental theoretical and experimental contributions to the field of internal aerodynamics, combustion and propulsion especially with respect to gas turbines and rockets, and educating generations of leaders in industry and academia.	
2000	William H. Pickering	For a distinguished career that pioneered and shaped the exploration of our solar system and for extraordinary contribution to engineering and science.	
2001	Richard T. Whitcomb	For seminal contributions in aeronautics, including the development of the Area rule, Supercritical airfoil, and Winglet concept, which are the basis for modern aerodynamic design.	
2002	John G. Borger	For significant pioneering contributions to aircraft and the airline industry from flying boats to jet aircraft.	
2003	Holt Ashley	For pioneering contributions to research, education and engineering in aeroelasticity, unsteady aerodynamics and aircraft design.	
2004	Courtland D. Perkins	For outstanding contributions to aeronautics in research and teaching in stability and control, and superlative leadership at the national and international levels.	
2005	Eugene E. Covert	For exemplary leadership in aeronautics teaching and research, development of significant state-of-the-art aerodynamic testing techniques, and outstanding contributions to public service.	
2006	Robert Loewy	For pioneering contributions to rotary-wing aeroelasticity and unsteady aerodynamics which had an enormous influence on rotary-wing technology and his contributions to education and public service in aeronautics.	
2007	Alexander H. Flax	For outstanding contributions to aerospace engineering in aeroelasticity, unsteady aerodynamics and flight mechanics, and for exceptional leadership of engineering organizations including service to the U.S. Department of Defense.	
2008	Earl Dowell	For pioneering contributions to nonlinear aeroelasticity, structural dynamics and unsteady aerodynamics which had a significant influence on aeronautics and for contributions to education and public service in aerospace engineering.	
2009	Arthur E. Bryson	For a lifetime of seminal contributions to real systems, creating and applying practical optimal control and estimation techniques to airplanes, rotorcraft, and missiles.	
2010	Robert H. Liebeck	For distinguished engineering as evidenced by the conception and development of Liebeck airfoils and Blended Wing Body aircraft.	
2011	Burt Rutan	For a distinguished career of highly innovative and successful flight vehicles ranging from home-built designed to Voyager and SpaceShipOne.	
2012	Frank D. Robinson	For conception, design, and manufacture of a family of quiet, affordable, reliable, and versatile helicopters.	
2013	Abraham Karem	For a lifetime of innovative fixed and rotary wing unmanned vehicle designs.	
2014	Alan Mulally	For leadership in the creation, design, development, and manufacture of commercial airplanes, exemplified by the Boeing 777.	
2015	Antony Jameson	For exceptional contributions to algorithmic innovation and the development of computational fluid dynamic codes that have made important contributions to aircraft design.	
2016	Walter Vincenti	For seminal pioneering supersonic wind tunnel research, education in high temperature gas dynamics, and exceptional contributions to the history of engineering technology.	
2017	Paul Bevilaqua	For the conception and demonstration of the multi-cycle propulsion system and other technologies enabling the production of the F-35 supersonic V/STOL Strike Fighters.	
2018	Irvin Glassman	In recognition of his profound impact on the application of combustion science and engineering to propulsion research and the successful development of propulsion systems.	
2019	Sheila E Widnall	In recognition of her outstanding contributions to aerodynamics through research, such as the identification of the Widnall Instability, as well as through education and public service including serving as Secretary of the U.S. Air Force.	
2020	Ozires Silva	For his leadership in the conception, production, and promotion of commercial aircraft, for founding Embraer S.A., and for his important roles in government and academia.	
2021	Alan C. Brown	For Innovation and Technical Leadership of the Design and Production of the F-117, the First Stealth Fighter/Bomber Aircraft.	
2023	Wayne Johnson	For landmark contributions to vertical flight aeronautics and resulting computational codes enabling the design of the first tiltrotor aircraft, eVTOL aircraft, and the Mars Helicopter.	
2024	Michimasa Fujino	For technical innovation and leadership in conceiving, designing, and bringing HondaJet to a leading position in the business jet market.	
2025	Stephen Tsai	For foundational contributions to the mechanics of composites over a distinguished 60-year career, resulting in laminate theory and failure criteria that are the basis of modern aerospace composite structures.	

== See also ==
- List of aviation awards
- List of engineering awards
- Wright Brothers Medal
- Wright Brothers Memorial Trophy
