= Arthur Raymond =

Arthur Raymond may refer to:

- Arthur Emmons Raymond (1899–1999), aeronautical engineer
- Arthur W. Raymond, American football coach and player
- Bugs Raymond (Arthur Lawrence Raymond, 1882–1912), Major League Baseball pitcher
