= Dwight Bennett =

Dwight Bennett may refer to:

- Dwight Bennett, pseudonym of D. B. Newton (1916–2013), American writer of westerns
- Dwight Henry Bennett (1917–2002), American aeronautical engineer
