= Solar Turbines =

American gas turbine production company

Solar Turbines Incorporated
- Company type: Subsidiary
- Industry: Oil and Gas Production and Transmission; Power generation
- Predecessor: Prudden-San Diego Airplane Company (1927-1929); Solar Aircraft Company (1929-1960); Solar Division of International Harvester Company (1960-1981)
- Founded: 1927; 99 years ago, in San Diego, California, United States
- Founder: George Prudden et al.
- Headquarters: San Diego, California, United States
- Area served: Worldwide
- Key people: Derrick York, President of Solar Turbines and Senior Vice President of Caterpillar Inc.
- Products: Titan 350; Titan 250; Titan 130; Mars 100; Mars 90; Taurus 70; Taurus 65; Taurus 60; Mercury 50; Centaur 50; Centaur 40; Saturn 20; Saturn 10
- Services: Leasing; Financing; Maintenance; Overhauling; Training
- Number of employees: 9000
- Parent: Caterpillar Inc.
- Website: solarturbines.com

Solar Turbines Incorporated, a wholly owned subsidiary of Caterpillar Inc., designs and manufactures industrial gas turbines for onshore and offshore electrical power generation, for marine propulsion and for producing, processing and transporting natural gas and oil.

The company traces its history to the 1927 founding of the Prudden-San Diego Airplane Company, which became the Solar Aircraft Company in 1929. Through the Great Depression, they mainly produced components for other manufacturers, growing during World War II and diversifying into non-aircraft products after the war. During this period, they won a number of contracts to produce jet engine components. Convinced that the gas turbine was the prime mover of the future, the company invested heavily in the development of small turbines.

The turbine never came to be the main prime mover, but Solar's expertise in small turbines found a number of niche roles. The company was purchased by International Harvester Company in early 1960, becoming the Solar Division of International Harvester in 1963. In 1973, the Solar Division exited the aerospace industry to focus solely on industrial turbines. In 1975, the development and manufacture of the Solar Division's radial engines was moved into a newly formed Radial Engines Group, renamed the Turbomach Division in 1980.

Solar Turbines Incorporated became a wholly owned subsidiary of Caterpillar Tractor Co. after Caterpillar purchased the assets of the Solar Division and the Turbomach division from International Harvester on 31 May 1981. In 1985, Caterpillar sold the Turbomach Division to Sundstrand Corporation.

== Prudden-San Diego Airplane Company ==
Solar Turbines traces its roots to the Prudden–San Diego Airplane Company, a partnership founded in 1927 between George Prudden and seven San Diego area businessmen. Due to differences in management philosophy between Prudden and his investors, Prudden left the company in November 1928.

== Solar Aircraft Company ==
=== First product—a trimotor airplane ===
In March 1929, Prudden-San Diego Airplane Company changed its name to Solar Aircraft Company, a reference to San Diego's sunny climate. Solar Aircraft Company's main product was an all-metal passenger aircraft powered by three Siemens & Halske radial engines. Due to the Great Depression in 1929, the company was unable to market the aircraft and made only three airplanes.

=== From airplanes to airplane components ===
The sales failure of the tri-motor airplane due to the Great Depression led Solar Aircraft Company into making parts for other manufacturers, especially hard-to-manufacture parts able to withstand high-temperatures, such as stainless steel exhaust manifolds. The company was reincorporated in 1937 as the Solar Aircraft Company, dropping the "Ltd" from its name. By 1939, Solar Aircraft Company had a work force of 229. Military orders during World War II led to rapid expansion and by the end of the war the company had a workforce of 5,000, largely part of a massive effort to build more than 300,000 exhaust manifolds for U.S. airplanes.

Business dropped considerably after World War II and the management developed a plan to diversify into producing other stainless steel products including caskets, frying pans, bulk milk containers and even redwood furniture; immediately after World War II, the company also produced the Solar Midget race car. Solar's expertise in hard-to-manufacture parts able to withstand high-temperatures led to contracts to produce jet engine components. Solar Aircraft began to design and manufacture completed turbine engines for the United States military for applications such as auxiliary power units, fuselages, and rocket engine components of guided missiles. Solar Aircraft continued to expand its product line and grow its business until it was purchased by International Harvester Company in early 1960, becoming the Solar Division of International Harvester in 1963.

=== Developing expertise in gas turbines ===
Solar Aircraft Company's expertise in high-temperature metallurgy led to work producing components for some of the first US jet engines, including the General Electric I-40 and a contract from the US Navy to build an afterburner for the Westinghouse J34. Solar Aircraft Company also won contracts for the Allison J33, Allison J35, Avro Canada Orenda, and Bristol Olympus. It was during this time that one of its engineers, Wendell Reed, developed the pneumatic engine microjet controller, for which he won the Wright Brothers Medal in 1955 and which became widely used for gas turbines, afterburners, and ramjets. This controller is described in "Flight" magazine, 2 December 1955.

Solar Aircraft Company's work in the jet engine field convinced the company's president, Edmund Price, that the turbine would be the main prime mover in the future. Solar Aircraft Company assembled a team under the direction of Paul Pitt in 1946 and started developing a small 80 horsepower (60 kW) axial-flow turbine as an auxiliary power unit for the US Army Air Force's Convair B-36 strategic bomber. The Army eventually canceled this contract, but Solar Aircraft Company soon won a contract from the US Navy in 1947 for a 250 kW system to provide emergency power on ships. First running in 1949, the T-400 would go on to provide power on minesweepers and landing craft.

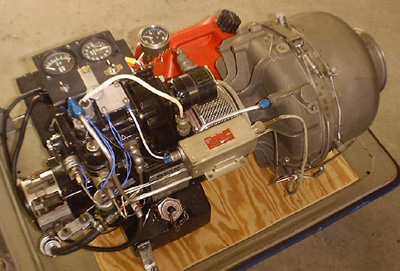
Solar Turbines T-62 turbine

Solar did win the contract to provide the APU for the first 632 KC-135A tankers for the Strategic Air Command.

In 1947, Leon Wosika and Eric Balje set up a second design line and developed a centrifugal-flow system that was much more compact than Solar's previous designs. Originally known as the MPM-45, the unit was delivered as the 45 horsepower (34 kW) "Mars". The Navy purchased the Mars to power portable fire fighting pumps on ships and gave it the designation T41. In 1956, the Navy turned to Solar to provide a slightly larger design to power a small helicopter, the Gyrodyne XRON-1. Solar Aircraft Company responded by developing a slightly larger version of the Mars, the 55 horsepower (41 kW) "Titan", which the Navy designated the T62. When the Navy abandoned development of Gyrodyne's XRON helicopter, Solar Aircraft Company adapted the Titan for service as an auxiliary power unit. Deliveries of this auxiliary power unit started in 1962. The Navy also had Solar adapt the Titan into a free-turbine version designated by the Navy as the T66, but this unit was never put into use. Solar Aircraft Company designed other versions of the basic Mars design, including the 350 horsepower (260 kW) Spartan, and the 13.5 horsepower (10.1 kW) Gemini.

In the late 1950s, the Navy once again turned to Solar, this time for a larger 750-kilowatt (1,010 hp) unit that would be used as an engine in a high-speed boat. The result was the axial-flow "Saturn" engine, which entered production in 1960. Solar started marketing the Saturn to industrial users needing a 1,000-horsepower (750 kW) unit for any role, and it went on to become the world's most widely used industrial gas turbine with some 4800 units in 80 countries. It remains in production today in two uprated and enhanced configurations. In order to make the system more attractive, Solar also started the design of various "front ends" that could be purchased as a complete unit with the Saturn. These included gas compressor sets, pump-drive packages and generator sets. These units, especially the gas compressors, are widely used in the natural gas industry as pumping units on pipelines.

== Solar Division of International Harvester ==
Just prior to the release of the Saturn, International Harvester purchased Solar Aircraft Company in early 1960.

In 1963, Solar Aircraft Company was re-organized as the Solar Division of International Harvester.

During the next decade, the Solar Division introduced a number of new designs, both larger and smaller than the Saturn. The Centaur, which first entered service in 1968, supplied 2,700 horsepower (2,000 kW), while the modern versions supply 4,700 horsepower (3,500 kW). In 1973, Solar exited the aviation industry to concentrate its resources on industrial gas turbines.

=== Products separated into two divisions ===
In the spring of 1975, International Harvester placed Solar Division's radial engine designs into the newly formed Radial Engine Group.

In 1980, the Radial Engine Group was renamed, becoming the Turbomach Division.

In 1977, the Solar Division introduced a larger version of the Centaur, the 10,600 horsepower (7,900 kW) Mars, re-using the name from the earlier smaller engine. The Mars is currently sold as the 13,220 horsepower (9,860 kW) Mars 90 and 16,000 horsepower (12,000 kW) Mars 100.

== Wholly owned subsidiary of Caterpillar Inc. ==
Caterpillar Tractor Co. purchased the assets of the Solar Division and the Turbomach Division from International Harvester on May 31, 1981. The newly acquired assets were organized as a wholly owned subsidiary of Caterpillar Tractor Co. named Solar Turbines Incorporated.

After the purchase, Caterpillar assigned development and manufacturing of the Caterpillar Model 5600 to Solar Turbines. The 5600 was originally developed by The Boeing Company as the Boeing 551/553 series, which Caterpillar had purchased when Boeing decided to exit the gas turbine business in 1966.

=== Sale of Turbomach Division to Sundstrand ===
In 1985, Caterpillar sold the Turbomach Division to Sundstrand Corporation (now Collins Aerospace), exiting the Centrifugal gas turbine engine business.

=== New products in the 80s and 90s ===
Solar Turbines Incorporated continued to introduce new versions of their axial-flow industrial engines throughout the 1980s and 90s, often re-using older names instead of introducing new names. In 1997, Solar Turbines Incorporated announced the Titan 130, a 19,500 horsepower (14,500 kW) design much larger than the original Titan. The latest model, the Titan 250, delivers 30,000 horsepower (22,000 kW).

Solar Turbines Incorporated has also been involved in a number of projects to improve the fuel economy of industrial turbines of all sorts. In 1992, Solar Turbines introduced the SoLoNOx system. The SoLoNOx system uses lean-burn technologies to reduce NOx emissions. The SoLoNOx system has been retrofitted to over 2,000 turbines and all of Solar Turbine's more recent designs can be equipped with SoLoNOx as a feature. In 1997, Solar Turbines introduced a ceramic hot-section design for the Centaur 50 and introduced a recuperator for the Mercury 50, in experiments conducted with the US Department of Energy.

=== Purchase of Turbomach S.A. ===
In 2004 Caterpillar acquired Swiss company Turbomach S.A. which had long been a packager of industrial turbines from Solar, Rolls-Royce, and Trent.

=== Current product line ===
Solar Turbine Incorporated's product line currently consists of the Saturn, Centaur, Mercury, Taurus, Mars and Titan turbines, and a variety of attachments that are sold with them. To date, Solar has sold more than 15,000 gas turbine systems, with a combined operating history of over 2 billion hours of use, equivalent to over 100,000 years.

==== Products ====
Electrical Generation Specifications								
Model	POWER RATING ISO Base Load (MW)	HEAT RATE Lower Heating Value (LHV) (Btu/kWhe)	POWER SHAFT SPEED (RPM)	PRESSURE RATIO	NUMBER OF COMBUSTORS	Exhaust Flow (lb/sec)	Exhaust Temp (°F)	Year Entered Production
Saturn 20	1.2	14,810	1800	6.7	1 (annular)	14.3	945	1960
Centaur 40	3.5	12,910	1800	10.1	1 (annular)	41.6	830	1968
Centaur 50	4.6	11,630	1800	10.6	1 (annular)	41.8	950	
Mercury 50	4.6	8,865	1800	9.9	1 (annular)	39	690	1998
Taurus 60	5.7	10,830	1800	9.9	1 (annular)	48	950	1989
Taurus 65	6.5	10,295	1800	15	1 (annular)	47.1	1000	
Taurus 70	8.2	9,920	1800	17.6	1 (annular)	59.2	970	1995
Mars 100	11.4	10,365	1800	17.7	1 (annular)	93.1	905	
Titan 130	16.5	9,605	1800	17.1	1 (annular)	124	915	1997
Titan 250	23.1	8,775	1800	24.4	1 (annular)	153.9	865	2008
Titan 350	38	8,495	1800	--	1 (annular)	237.5	910	
Taurus 60 MPU	5.7	10,830	1800	9.9	1 (annular)	48	950	
Titan 130 MPU	16.5	9,605	1800	17.1	1 (annular)	124	915	

Note: Specifications are for natural gas fuel. MPU stands for Mobile Power Unit (trailer mounted). SMT stands for Solar Mobile Turbomachinery which is specifically designed to not need a crane to set up. Estimates are for natural gas fuel. Zero installation losses.

Mechanical Drive Specifications
Model	POWER RATING ISO Base Load (hp)	HEAT RATE Lower Heating Value (LHV) (Btu/hp-hr)	POWER SHAFT SPEED (RPM)	PRESSURE RATIO	NUMBER OF COMBUSTORS	Exhaust Flow (kg/sec)	Exhaust Temp (°C)
Saturn 20	1590	10360	22300	6.7	1 (annular)	6.5	520
Centaur 40	4700	9100	15500	10.3	1 (annular)	18.2	450
Centaur 50	6130	8485	16500	10.3	1 (annular)	18.8	515
Taurus 60	7700	7950	14000	12.2	1 (annular)	21.7	510
Taurus 70	11150	7190	11000	16.5	1 (annular)	27.2	500
Mars 90	13220	7655	9500	16.3	1 (annular)	40.2	465
Mars 100	15900	7395	9500	17.1	1 (annular)	42.6	485
Titan 130	22490	7020	8500	16.1	1 (annular)	56.1	495
Titan 250	30000	6360	7000	24.1	1 (annular)	68.2	465
