= Sarto =

Sarto is an Italian surname, and may refer to:

== People ==
- Sarto Fournier (1909 – 1980), Canadian politician.
- Andrea del Sarto (1486 – 1531), Italian painter from Florence.
- Antônio Sarto (1926–2008), Brazilian bishop.
- Giuseppe Sarto (1835–1914), Pope Pius X.
- Maria Sabrina Sarto (born 1968), Italian nanotechnologist
- Mario Sarto (1885–1955), Italian sculptor
- Leonardo Sarto (1992-), Italian Rugby Union player

== Places ==
- Sarto, Manitoba
