= Solar Midget =

The Solar midget car was a type of midget car racing vehicle produced by the Solar Aircraft Company immediately following the end of World War II. The first midget car to be mass-produced, the vehicle was designed by Elmer Ross using a car body designed by Curly Wetteroth; the car was developed as part of the company's 1944 Craftsmanship Contest; production was approved in October 1945, with twelve pre-production vehicles being constructed as a manufacturing test; they utilised aluminum frames and stainless steel bodywork.

The twelve pilot kits sold rapidly; full production was approved; at a cost of $670 USD each, over 100 vehicles, primarily using Ford flathead V-8 power, were sold during 1946. However, the rival Kurtis Kraft midget designed by Frank Kurtis proved superior to the Solar vehicle in competition, and at the end of 1946 Solar ceased production of the midget car kits.
