= Eastman Jacobs =

American aerodynamicist (1902–1987)

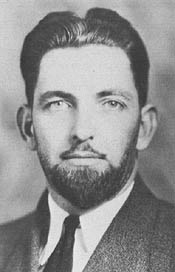
Eastman Jacobs

Eastman Jacobs (1902–1987) was a leading American aerodynamicist who worked for NACA's Langley Memorial Aeronautical Laboratory (renamed NASA Langley Research Center in 1958) from the 1920s to the 1940s. He was responsible for advancing many fields in aerodynamics, dealing particularly with wind tunnels, airfoils, turbulence, boundary layers, and Schlieren photography.

== Biography ==
Eastman Jacobs joined NACA in 1925 after earning a bachelor's degree in Electrical Engineering at the University of California, Berkeley. He applied at the Bell Labs but was not accepted and opted for his second choice Langley. His knowledge of complex analysis was key to current airfoil design techniques at the time. He quickly became one of the leading scientists at the Langley Research Center due to his work with optimizing airfoils using a variable density wind tunnel that could operate with high Reynolds numbers. He was also officially the head of the Variable Density Wind Tunnel Division from 1928-1939. He and his colleagues were able to significantly reduce the turbulence in the wind tunnel, which led to a better understanding of boundary development around airfoil sections. A better knowledge of boundary layer growth then led to an optimization scheme for low-drag laminar flow airfoils. This optimization scheme produced the NACA 6-digit airfoils that led to faster aircraft like the P-51 Mustang in World War II. In 1937, he received the Sylvanus Albert Reed Award for his improvement of airfoils.

By the 1930s, Jacobs became interested in high-speed wind tunnels, and helped to build one of the first in the United States. He became the first person to observe a shock wave propagating over an airfoil using Schlieren photography. In 1935, he was invited to the now famous fifth Volta conference on aerodynamics titled "High Velocities in Aviation". There, he gave a presentation on high-speed wind tunnels and his Schlieren images which exposed the technology to the rest of the world.

Later in his career, he designed a motorjet aircraft referred to "Jake's Jeep", but this work was canceled by the NACA. He retired at an early age of 42 in 1944.

A restaurant he started in 1958, called "Panorama Pacific at Solimar," on his property near the Pacific Coast Highway on the Ventura-Los Angeles county line in Malibu, became known throughout the 1960s as "Jake's Diner." The restaurant survives today as "Neptune's Net". Jacobs died June 21, 1987 and his ashes were spread on his ranch property.

== Awards ==
- Wright Brothers Medal – 1933

== See also ==
- NACA airfoil
