= Holt Ashley =

American aeronautical engineer

- Born: January 10, 1923; San Francisco, U.S.
- Died: May 9, 2006 (aged 83)
- Education: Massachusetts Institute of Technology
- Occupation: Aeronautical engineer
- Scientific career
- Thesis: An experimental investigation of the flutter characteristics of low density wings
- Doctoral advisor: Manfred Rauscher, Shatswell Ober

Holt Ashley (January 10, 1923 – May 9, 2006) was an American aeronautical engineer notable for his seminal research on aeroelasticity.

== Early life and education ==
Ashley was born in San Francisco, California. His father was Harold Ashley, an American businessman who served in both World War I and World War II.

On the outbreak of World War II, he took leave from the California Institute of Technology and joined the Army Air Corps. Following completion of an undergraduate degree at the University of Chicago for meteorology, he flew as a weather forecaster and reconnaissance officer with squadrons in the Atlantic and Europe. In this time, he would earn 6 military medals and publish his paper "Icing in North West Europe."

Ashley attended the Massachusetts Institute of Technology (MIT), located in Cambridge, Massachusetts, from which he received a Master of Science degree in aeronautical engineering in 1948 and later a Doctor of Philosophy degree in 1951, also in aeronautical engineering.

== Career ==
From 1951 to 1954, he was a member of the faculty at MIT. Ashley served as an MIT associate professor from 1954 to 1960, when he became a full professor at MIT in 1960.

In 1964, he helped establish the Department of Aeronautical Engineering at the Indian Institute of Technology in Kanpur, India. He served as its first head of Department until 1967 when he returned to America.

In 1967, Ashley joined the Department of Aeronautics and Astronautics at Stanford University, located in Palo Alto, California, where he was a professor of Aeronautics and Astronautics.

In 1970, he was elected to the National Academy of Engineering for "contributions to the field of aerolastic structures and unsteady aerodynamics, aiding in the solutions of problems in vibration and gust loading".

Ashley served as president of the American Institute of Aeronautics and Astronautics (AIAA).

He also served on the advisory boards of NASA, the National Advisory Committee for Aeronautics, the U.S. Air Force and the U.S. Navy.

He died on 9 May 2006, age 83.

== Legacy ==
The AIAA established an award in Ashley's honor – the Holt Ashley Award for Aeroelasticity.

=== Notable awards and honors ===
- 1969 – the AIAA Structures, Structural Dynamics and Materials Award
- 1981 – the AIAA Wright Brothers Lecture Award
- 1987 – the Ludwig-Prandtl-Ring from the Deutsche Gesellschaft für Luft- und Raumfahrt
- 2003 – the AIAA the Daniel Guggenheim Medal
- 2006 – the AIAA Reed Aeronautics Award

== See also ==
- List of aerospace engineers
- List of Massachusetts Institute of Technology alumni
- List of Massachusetts Institute of Technology faculty
- List of people from San Francisco
- List of Stanford University people
