= George W. Lewis =

American aeronautical engineer

George W. Lewis

George William Lewis (March 10, 1882 – July 12, 1948) was the director of aeronautical research at the National Advisory Committee for Aeronautics (NACA) until he retired in 1947. He taught at Swarthmore College from 1910 to 1917.

== Biography ==
In 1910, Lewis graduated from Cornell University with a master's degree in mechanical engineering and proceeded to teach at Swarthmore College until 1917. He became involved in aircraft engines, which led to his membership in NACA's Power Plants Subcommittee. In 1919, he was appointed as NACA's first executive officer. Five years later, he was named as the director of aeronautical research, a position he held until his retirement. During those years, Lewis was stationed in Washington, D.C., to handle many of NACA's political and bureaucratic issues. At the same time, he oversaw research advancements and technical publications at NACA's Langley Research Center. During his time as director, engineers at the Langley facility were responsible for numerous advancements in the understanding of aerodynamics. These achievements earned Lewis international renown, and NACA expanded from a few employees to several thousand during his tenure.

Dr. Hugh L. Dryden succeeded Lewis as the director of aeronautical research at NACA. The NASA John H. Glenn Research Center at Lewis Field in Cleveland, Ohio is partly named after him.

== Awards and honors ==
- 1936 Daniel Guggenheim Medal
- 1944 ASME Spirit of St. Louis Medal
- 1944 Member of the American Philosophical Society
- 1945 Member of the United States National Academy of Sciences
- 1948 Medal for Merit from the U.S. President
