= Wendell E. Reed =

American aircraft engineer

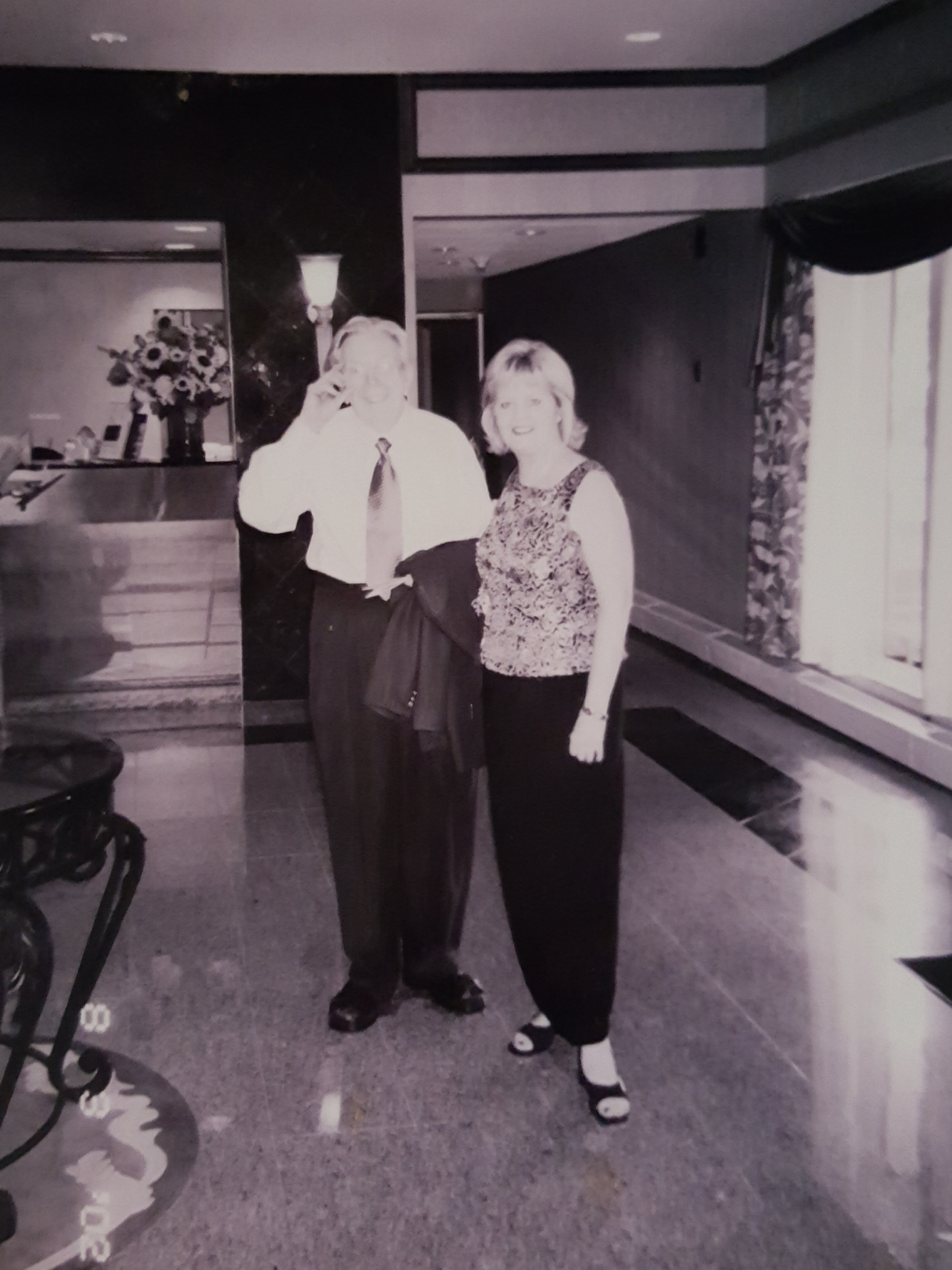
Wendell and Carol Race (his oldest daughter)

Wendell E. Reed (c.1924 - March 29, 2005) was an American aircraft engineer noted primarily for inventing the engine microjet controller (EMC) (U.S. patent 2,726,507, U.S. patent 2,981,058), for which he was awarded the Wright Brothers Medal in 1955. Reed's experiences in the USAAF piloting the B-25 kindled a lifelong interest in flight and he later completed his degree at University of Wisconsin in Mechanical Engineering. He subsequently joined Solar Aircraft Co, where he developed the EMC.
