= David S. Lewis =

American aeronautical engineer

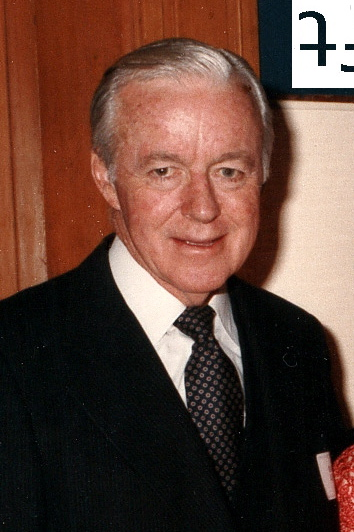
David Lewis, 1983

David Sloan Lewis Jr. (July 6, 1917 – December 15, 2003) was an American aeronautical engineer who led aerospace and defense giant General Dynamics for 14 years.

== Early life ==
David Lewis was born in 1917, in North Augusta, South Carolina. As a child, he loved to read aviation books and build model aircraft.

Lewis attended the University of South Carolina, and transferred to Georgia Tech for his last two years. He graduated in 1939 with a degree in aeronautical engineering. While at Georgia Tech, he was a member of the Sigma Alpha Epsilon fraternity.

== Career ==
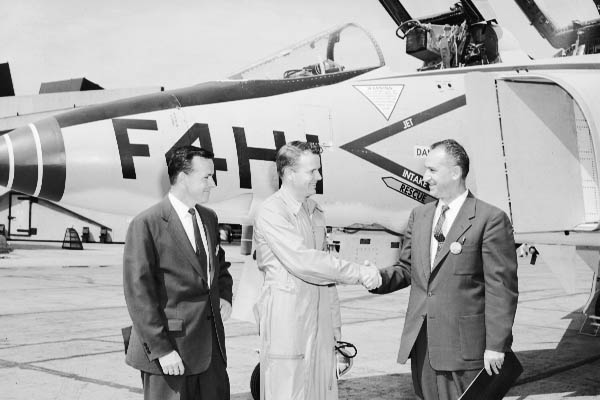
Key figures in the F-4 development: David Lewis, Robert Little and Herman Barkey

After college Lewis began his work career at the Glenn L. Martin Company. Then in 1946, he moved to McDonnell Aircraft Company and became chief of aerodynamics. He was the program manager for the highly successful F-4 Phantom II jet fighter.

Following the merger of McDonnell and Douglas Aircraft Company in 1967, David Lewis served as president of McDonnell Douglas until 1970.

Lewis became the head of General Dynamics in 1970. He was influential in having the F-16 design team choose the Pratt & Whitney F100 turbofan engine following his experience with the engine in the McDonnell Douglas F-15 fighter. He remained head of the company until he retired in 1986, following pressure from a congressional subcommittee investigating fraud at General Dynamics, specifically the Electric Boat Division involving submarine contracts and cost overruns. Upon his retirement, the investigation was halted and he remained on the board of directors through 1993. He also served on the Board of Directors for Ralston Purina and Mead Paper, as well as the Board Executive Committee for Bank of America.

Lewis received numerous national and international awards for his contribution to the field of aeronautics, including the Robert J. Collier Trophy in 1975, the Golden Plate Award of the American Academy of Achievement in 1977, the Fleet Admiral Chester W. Nimitz Award in 1981, the Daniel Guggenheim Medal in 1982, and the Wright Brothers Memorial Trophy in 1984. Lewis was inducted into the South Carolina Business Hall of Fame in 2000. He was a member of the Georgia Tech Council of Distinguished Engineering Graduates and a trustee emeritus of the Georgia Tech and Washington University in St. Louis Foundations. He was named a Fellow of the American Institute of Aeronautics and Astronautics, and the National Academy of Engineering.

== Personal life ==
Lewis was married to his wife, Dorothy, for 62 years. They had four children.
