= William Littlewood =

William Littlewood was an aeronautical engineer noted for his contributions to the design and operational requirements of transport aircraft. He graduated from Cornell University in 1920 and was the only person to preside over both SAE and AIAA, two of the main aerospace professional organizations. He won the Wright Brothers Medal in 1935 for a paper on the operational requirements of transports and is memorialized by the SAE "William Littlewood Memorial Lecture", and was a recipient of Daniel Guggenheim Medal in 1958 For leadership and continuous personal participation over a quarter of a century in developing the equipment and operating techniques of air transport.
