= Sitaram Rao Valluri =

Indian engineer and scientist (1924–2019)

- Born: 25 June 1924; Eluru, Madras Presidency, British India
- Died: 23 January 2019 (aged 94); Bangalore, Karnataka, India
- Education: Banaras Hindu University; Indian Institute of Science; Caltech
- Scientific career
- Fields: Aeronautical engineer

Sitaram Rao Valluri (June 25, 1924 – January 23, 2019) was an engineer and scientist noted for his work in metal fatigue. He completed his doctorate in 1954 at Caltech with a dissertation under Ernest Sechler and stayed thereafter to continue his research work. In 1963, he won the Wright Brothers Medal with George Bockrath and James Glassco for a paper on the relationship between crack propagation and fatigue in metals. He later returned to India and joined the Applied Mechanics Department of Indian Institute of Technology, Madras where he distinguished himself as a teacher, an outstanding researcher and a pre-eminent authority in the field of metal fatigue. He was invited to take over as the Director of National Aeronautical laboratory in Bangalore, later renamed as CSIR- National Aerospace Laboratories to succeed the first director Dr.P. Nilakantan. During his tenure for 19 years, he transformed NAL into a vibrant force in Indian Aeronautics. He was also instrumental in framing the new recruitment and assessment scheme of CSIR, popularly known as Valluri /Varadarajan Committee which recommended a new policy of recruitment and assessment in the CSIR laboratories in the year 1981. This was widely acknowledged as one of the most significant steps which led to the arrest of attrition of bright scientific personnel from advanced scientific institutions in India. He played a major role in the conception of the light combat aircraft (LCA) program in 1980s and briefly served as the first Director General of the Aeronautical Development Agency, Bangalore, the nodal agency for the design and development of LCA in 1985.

Dr. S.R. Valluri figures in the IISc wall of fame and in the list of recipients of the Padma Shri, awarded by Government of India and the Vasvik industrial research award (1976). He was the founder President of the IISc Alumni association in 1976 and an elected fellow of the Indian Academy of Sciences in 1971.
