= Robert P. Johannes =

American aeronautical engineer (1934–2004)

Robert P. Johannes (March 12, 1934 – June 30, 2004) was an American aeronautical engineer noted primarily as one of the developers of the control configured vehicle (CCV) concept. He won the Wright Brothers Medal in 1972 with Dwight Henry Bennett for the paper Combat Capabilities and Versatility Through CCV discussing its applications.

== Biography ==
Johannes was born in Davenport, Iowa on March 12, 1934. He received his Bachelor of Science degree in electrical engineering from the University of Illinois at Urbana-Champaign and his Master of Science degree in Electrical Engineering from the Air Force Institute of Technology in 1961. He then joined the Flight Dynamics Lab at Wright-Patterson AFB, where he worked on various defense-related and basic-science research projects, including self-adaptive control via the X-15 demonstrator in the early 1960s. He managed the LAMS program in the late 1960s and developed the concept of CCV in 1970–1974. Johannes is also an avid amateur pilot, having earned the Soaring Society of America Silver Badge in 1975.

Johannes died in St. Charles, Missouri on June 30, 2004, at the age of 70.

== Awards ==
- Wright Brothers Medal, 1972
- USAF Scientific Achievement Award, 1973
- Soaring Society of America Silver Badges, 1975
