= George Eugene Bockrath =

George Eugene Bockrath (February 15, 1911, in Chicago – December 2, 1998) was an aeronautical engineer and early researcher in fracture mechanics. He earned a BS in aeronautical engineering from the University of Michigan and began his research career as an assistant professor at The Catholic University of America in 1936. He later moved to Douglas Aircraft Company, carrying on work in fracture and fatigue of metals. It was for work done during this period with James Glassco and Sitaram Valluri that he won the Wright Brothers Medal in 1963.
