= Stephen Joseph Zand =

American aeronautical pioneer (1898–1963)

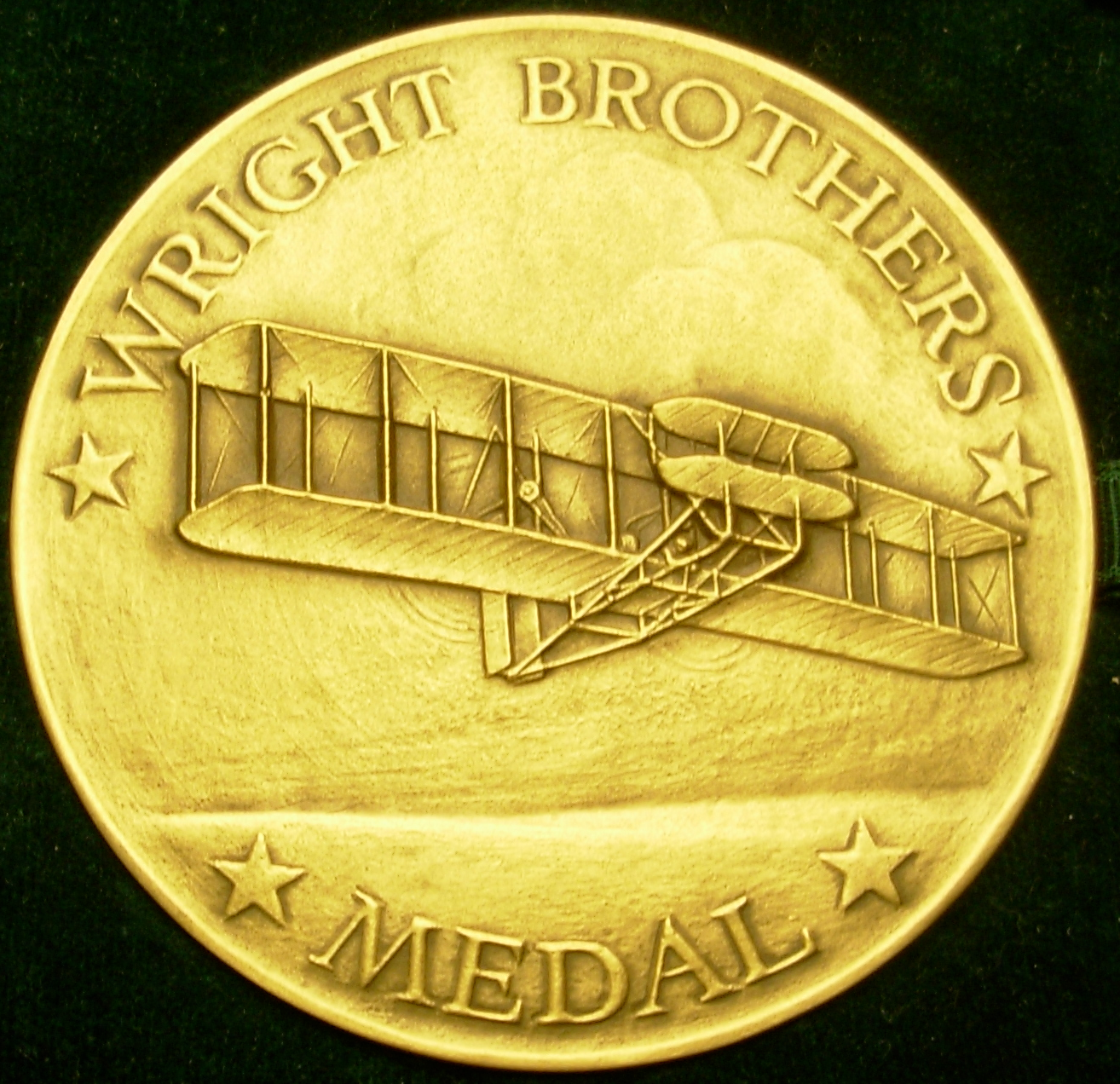
The Wright Brothers Medal

Stephen Joseph Zand (September 18, 1898 – 24 January 1963) was an American aeronautical pioneer who worked at the Sperry Gyroscope Co. and was later vice president of engineering at the Lord Corporation. He solved many of the early problems related to vibrations and sound. He won the Wright Brothers Medal in 1931 for a paper on how vibration affects on-board instruments.

== Awards ==
- Fellow, Royal Aeronautical Society
- Fellow, Institute of Aeronautical Sciences (later AIAA)
- Wright Brothers Medal, 1931
- Medal for Merit from the U.S. President
