= Richard V. Rhode =

American aeronautical engineer

Richard V. Rhode (March 2, 1904 – November 13, 1994) was an American aeronautical engineer at Langley Memorial Aeronautical Laboratory, who researched aerodynamic loading. He was awarded the Wright Brothers Medal in 1937 for this work. He continued doing secret aerodynamics-related research work during World War II, the results of which were later declassified.

== Early life and education ==
Rhode was born on March 2, 1904 in Kenosha, Wisconsin. He received a B.S. in mechanical engineering from the University of Wisconsin in 1925.

== Career ==
After graduation he joined the National Advisory Committee for Aeronautics (NACA) as an aeronautical engineer at the Langley Aeronautical Laboratory. He married Frances Elizabeth May in 1929 and had four children: Elizabeth May (deceased), Mary Diana (deceased), Joseph George, II and Richard Valentine, Jr. In 1945 he became chief of the aircraft loads division. In 1949 he transferred to the NACA Headquarters in Washington, D.C., and became assistant director for research (aircraft construction and operating problems). When NASA came into existence in 1958, he became assistant director for advanced design criteria in the space vehicle technology division. There, he was responsible for advanced technology supporting the development of space vehicles.

== Legacy ==
He retired in early 1967 and was awarded the NASA Medal for Exceptional Scientific Achievement. He died on November 13, 1994 in North Carolina.
