= John M. Riebe =

American aerospace engineer

John Michael Riebe
- Born: 8 May 1921; Lansford, Pennsylvania
- Died: 21 February 2011 (aged 89); Newport News, Virginia
- Education: Rensselaer Polytechnic Institute
- Scientific career
- Fields: Aeronautical engineering
- Workplaces: Langley Memorial Aeronautical Laboratory, NACA

John Michael Riebe (8 May 1921 – 21 February 2011) was an American aeronautical engineer and inventor who contributed to the early designs of flight surfaces. Other significant contributions included being project engineer in the development of the Grumman F8F Bearcat fighter, involvement with short takeoff and landing projects for airline terminals, and work on control systems for rockets, flying boats, delta wings and powered lift systems. He performed tests in the numerous wind tunnels of the National Advisory Committee for Aeronautics' Langley Memorial Aeronautical Laboratory in Langley Field, Virginia (now NASA's Langley Research Center in Langley Air Force Base, Virginia), where he was employed.

Many of the tests he performed, as well as the resulting data and reports, were classified at the time because they were wartime reports, but have been since declassified and available to the general public.

== Biography ==
John Michael Riebe was born on 8 May 1921, in Lansford, Pennsylvania, the United States. He attended Rensselaer Polytechnic Institute in Troy, New York and graduated with a Bachelor of Aeronautical Engineering. He began working at the National Advisory Committee for Aeronautics on 3 January 1943. On 19 August 1946, he received an honorable discharge from the United States Army. He then went on to produce 60 publications and five patents. He retired from NACA (which had become NASA) in December 1974.

== Publicity ==
In Popular Science, July 2006 edition, a design was featured in an article, which was invented by Riebe & Vernard E. Lockwood.
