= Myron Tribus =

American organizational theorist

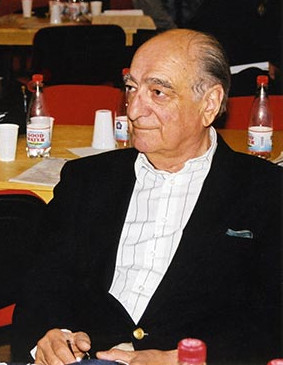
- Born: Myron Tribus; October 30, 1921; San Francisco, California, U.S.
- Died: August 31, 2016 (aged 94)
- Education: University of California, Berkeley (BS); University of California, Los Angeles (PhD)
- Occupations: organization theorist; educator
- Employers: General Electric; University of California, Los Angeles; University of Michigan (1952–1954); Dartmouth College (1961–1969); U.S. Department of Commerce (1969–1970); Xerox; Massachusetts Institute of Technology (1974–1986)
- Spouse: Cora "Sue" Davis
- Children: 2
- Military career
- Allegiance: United States
- Branch: U.S. Air Force
- Rank: Captain
- Conflicts: World War II

Myron Tribus (October 30, 1921 – August 31, 2016) was an American organizational theorist, who was the director of the Center for Advanced Engineering Study at MIT from 1974 to 1986. He was known as leading supporter and interpreter of W. Edwards Deming, for popularizing the Bayesian methods, and for coining the term "thermoeconomics".

== Early life ==
Myron Tribus was born in San Francisco, California, on October 30, 1921 to Marie Kramer and Edward Lefkowitz. Myron's father died shortly thereafter, and his mother, a short-hand typist, remarried to Julius Tribus. He graduated in 1942 from the University of California, Berkeley with a Bachelor of Science in chemistry, and received his Ph.D in engineering in 1949 from the University of California, Los Angeles.

== Career ==
Tribus was a captain in the U.S. Air Force during World War II, and worked as a design-development officer at Wright Field. While in the Air Force, he developed thermal ice protection equipment for aircraft.

He joined General Electric in 1949 and became a gas turbine design engineer, but was unhappy in industry. He returned to academia, joining the faculty of University of California, Los Angeles (UCLA), where he taught thermodynamics, fluid mechanics, and heat transfer. He was a visiting assistant professor of chemical engineering and director of icing research at the University of Michigan between 1952 and 1954. While at UCLA, he hosted Threshold, an hour long television program dealing with science and its impact on society. It aired on CBS in 1958.

In 1961, he was named dean of Thayer School of Engineering at Dartmouth College, where he led the faculty in developing a new curriculum based on engineering design and entrepreneurship. He believed that hands-on engineering design was essential at all levels of the curriculum, saying, "Knowledge without know-how is sterile." He remained in the role until 1969.

In 1969, Tribus accepted a political appointee post in the Richard M. Nixon administration as Assistant Secretary of Commerce for Science and Technology. On November 23, 1970, he left the Department of Commerce after 18 months to become Senior Vice President for Research & Engineering in Xerox Corp. From 1974 to 1986, Tribus directed the Center for Advanced Engineering Study at Massachusetts Institute of Technology. During his tenure, the Center published W. Edwards Deming's groundbreaking book, Out of the Crisis. He helped expand the Center's Video Course Program, a precursor of MIT Professional Education. He also helped to increase enrollment in the Center's Advanced Study Program.

Tribus was a co-founder of Exergy Inc., a company specializing in the design of advanced, high-efficiency power production systems. In his later years, he focused on the theory of structural cognitive modifiability of Reuven Feuerstein, an Israeli psychologist.

== Research ==
Tribus research interests ranged from academic subjects such as heat transfer, fluid mechanics, probability theory, statistical inference, and thermodynamics, to applied topics such as sea water demineralization, aircraft heating, aircraft ice prevention, and the design of engineering curricula. He also had a strong influence concerning the domains of industrial quality, ergonomics, and education.

Tribus was a leading supporter and interpreter of W. Edwards Deming. He is also known in the 1970s for an insightful book entitled Rational Descriptions, Decisions and Designs, which popularized Bayesian methods with examples. In the 1960s, Tribus coined the term "thermoeconomics".

=== Perversity Principle ===
If you try to improve the performance of a system of people, machines, and procedures by setting numerical goals for the improvement of individual parts of the system, the system will defeat your efforts and you will pay a price where you least expect it.

— Myron Tribus, "Perversity Principle"

This idea was close to a quotation by Paul Valéry about the spontaneous creation of counter-measures defeating measures. It was reformulated by Stephen Covey as "Whoever tries to manage his business only looking at figures will soon not have anymore the figures nor the business."

== Personal life ==
Tribus married Cora "Sue" Davis, whom he met during the war. Together, they had two daughters: Kamala and Lou Andreas. Tribus died on August 31, 2016.

== Legacy and honors ==
- Elected member of the National Academy of Engineering in 1973, under Special Fields & Interdisciplinary Engineering, for his contributions to applied sciences that support engineering, to engineering education, and for professional service in education, government, and industry.
- Thurman H. Bane award
- Society of Automotive Engineers's Wright Brothers Medal, 1945
- American Society of Civil Engineers's Alfred Noble Prize as a joint award from seven societies for his work developing a thermal ice protection system for aircraft, 1952.
- UCLA's Engineering Alumnus of the Year, 1971–1972
- ASME Robert Henry Thurston Lecture Award, 1975
- American Statistical Association's Deming Lecturer Award in 1998 for "The Contributions of W. Edwards Deming to the Improvement of Education"
- Honorary degrees
  - Master of Arts from Dartmouth College, 1962
  - Doctor of Science from Rockford College, 1965
  - Doctor of Science from Oakland University, 1971

== Publications ==
=== Books ===
Tribus published two books; Thermostatics and Thermodynamics, the first textbook basing the laws of thermodynamics on information theory rather than on the classical arguments, and Rational Descriptions, Decisions, and Designs, introducing Bayesian Decision methods into the engineering design process.

- Tribus, Myron (1961). Thermodynamics and Thermostatics: An Introduction to Energy, Information and States of Matter, with Engineering Applications. University Series in Basic Engineering, vol. 1. Princeton: D. Van Nostrand. OCLC 1036889774.
- Tribus, Myron (1969). Rational Descriptions, Decisions and Designs. Pergamon Press. doi:10.1016/C2013-0-01558-7. ISBN 978-0-08-006393-5. OCLC 610175111.

=== Papers ===
He published over 100 papers including:

- Levine, Raphael D., and Myron Tribus, eds. The maximum entropy formalism. Cambridge: MIT Press, 1979.
- Tribus, Myron (1989). Deployment flow charting. Quality & Productivity, Inc. ASIN
- Tribus, Myron (1992). Quality first: Selected papers on quality and productivity improvement. National Society of Professional Engineers; 4th ed edition.
- Tribus, Myron (1992). The Germ theory of management. SPC Press.

He also published Goals and Gaols, a short work in which he illustrated with many historic examples how premature specialization may push students to a dead end, given the fast obsolescence of techniques.

- Tribus, Myron (1967). Goals and Gaols, Journal of Engineering Education, vol. 57, p. 282.
