= Richard E. Hayden =

American acoustics specialist (born 1946)

Richard E. Hayden (born March 23, 1946) is a specialist in acoustics. He earned a BS from Norwich University and an MS from Purdue University, after which he joined Bolt, Beranek, and Newman, where he embarked on a research program in the acoustics of flow/surface interactions. He won the Wright Brothers Medal in 1973 for a paper entitled Fundamental Aspects of Noise Reduction From Powered Lift Devices.

== Awards ==
- Wright Brothers Medal, 1973
