= William C. Mentzer =

William C. Mentzer (May 27, 1907 – December 23, 1971) was an aeronautical engineer noted for his contributions to the airline industry, dealing particularly with aircraft maintenance and economics. He was born in Knoxville, Iowa. After graduating from MIT in 1934, he worked for United Airlines as an engineer. During the course of his career, he was involved in the development of over 50 aircraft and was eventually promoted to a senior management level. He was elected a fellow of the American Institute of Aeronautics and Astronautics and a member of the National Academy of Engineering. He died in Palo Alto, California. He was posthumously awarded the Daniel Guggenheim Medal in 1972.
