= Arthur W. Raymond =

American football player and coach

Playing career
- 1910–1912: Ohio State
- 1915: Canton Bulldogs
- 1916: Youngstown Patricians
- Positions: Tackle, guard

Coaching career (HC unless noted)
- 1914–1915: Ohio Northern

Head coaching record
- Overall: 8–9–1

Arthur W. "Bugs" Raymond was an American football coach and player. He served as the head football coach at Ohio Northern University from 1914 to 1915, compiling a record of 8–9–1. Raymond played for the Canton Bulldogs (1915) and Youngstown Patricians (1916) of the Ohio League.

== Head coaching record ==
Year	Team	Overall	Conference	Standing	Bowl/playoffs
Ohio Northern (Independent) (1914–1915)
1914	Ohio Northern	4–5			
1915	Ohio Northern	4–4–1			
Ohio Northern:		8–9–1			
Total:		8–9–1			
