= Robert Loewy =

American aerospace engineer (1926–2025)

Robert Gustav Loewy (February 12, 1926 – January 3, 2025) was an American aerospace engineer who has been influential in the development of rotary-wing vertical take-off and landing aircraft.

== Life and career ==
Loewy was born in Philadelphia, Pennsylvania, on February 12, 1926. He graduated from Rensselaer Polytechnic Institute in the class of 1947 with a Bachelor of Aeronautical Engineering degree. He earned an M.S. from the Massachusetts Institute of Technology and a Ph.D. from the University of Pennsylvania. From 1948 to 1962, Dr. Loewy worked in industry for the Glenn L. Martin Company; Piasecki Helicopter Corporation; Cornell Aeronautical Laboratory; and Vertol Aircraft, which later became a division of the Boeing Company. Between September 1965 and 1966, he was chief scientist for the United States Air Force.

As a faculty member at the University of Rochester, Loewy was professor of mechanical and aerospace sciences, director of the Space Science Center and finally dean of the College of Engineering and Applied Sciences. In 1974 he moved to RPI where he became provost and professor of aeronautical engineering and mechanics. From 1973 to 1977 he was chairman of the USAF Scientific Advisory Board.

In 1978, Loewy became a Rensselaer Polytechnic Institute professor, which is a senior teaching and research position in the School of Engineering. He later founded the Rotorcraft Technology Center at RPI and served as its director.

He joined Georgia Tech in 1993 and became William R. T. Oakes honorary professor and chair of the School of Aerospace Engineering. He was awarded the Daniel Guggenheim Medal for aeronautical engineering in 2006. In 1971, he was elected a member of the National Academy of Engineering for contributions to the engineering of rotary-wing, vertical take-off and landing aircraft. He was also awarded the Spirit of St. Louis Medal. He was inducted into RPI's Alumni Hall of Fame in 2009.

Loewy died on January 3, 2025, at the age of 98.
