= Maria Sabrina Sarto =

Italian nanotechnologist

Maria Sabrina Sarto (born 1968) is an Italian nanotechnologist whose research involves carbon structures including graphene nanoplates and carbon nanowires, with applications including electromagnetic shielding and composite materials for aerospace. She is a professor in and head of the Department of Astronautical, Electrical, and Energy Engineering at Sapienza University of Rome.

== Education and career ==
Sarto was born in 1968 in Rome. She earned a laurea in engineering (the Italian equivalent of a master's degree) in 1992 at Sapienza University of Rome, and completed a Ph.D. there in 1997. After working as a researcher at Sapienza University from 1994 to 1998, she became an associate professor in 1998, and a full professor in 2005. Since 2016 she has been head of the Department of Astronautical, Electrical, and Energy Engineering.

== Recognition ==
Sarto became a distinguished lecturer of the IEEE Electromagnetic Compatibility Society in 2001, its first female distinguished lecturer. She was elected as an IEEE Fellow in 2010, "for contributions to advanced materials in electromagnetic compatibility applications".

Sarto was part of a team that won the Wright Brothers Medal in 2003, for their work analyzing the effects of lightning on aviation electronics.
