= Oswald S. Williams Jr. =

African-American aeronautical engineer, businessman, and academic

Oswald S. Williams Jr
- Born: Oswald Sparrow Williams Jr; September 2, 1921. Washington, D.C
- Died: September 2, 2005 (aged 84); Jamaica Estates, New York
- Occupations: Engineer, marketing executive

Oswald S. Williams Jr. (1921–2005) was an American aeronautical engineer, businessman, and academic. Williams worked on a number of notable engineering projects, and eventually became the vice president of Grumman International. According to some sources, Williams was the second African-American to earn a degree in aeronautical engineering.

== Early life and education ==
Williams was born in 1921, and grew up in New York City. Williams developed an interest in aviation from a young age, and was noted to have enjoyed making model airplanes. He attended Boys High School in Brooklyn, and would go on to enroll in New York University's School on Engineering in 1938. Williams graduated with a bachelor’s degree in 1943, as the second African-American to earn a degree in aeronautical engineering. He went on to graduate with a master’s degree in the same subject in 1947.

== Career ==
Despite the war causing a massive expansion of the aviation industry, Williams - as an African-American - was not considered for many jobs. He found employment at the Pitcairn Autogiro Company in Willow Grove, Pennsylvania, where he worked on glider aircraft. At the end of 1942 he started work at Republic Aviation Group (he gained an interview by bluffing his way into a Republic facility), where he worked until 1947. He earned a master's degree in aeronautical engineering from NYU that same year.

In the postwar period, Williams was employed at a New York hydraulics company, where he was employed from 1951 to 1957 working on developing a direction beacon for the United States Air Force. From 1956 to 1961 he worked at Thiokol, helping to develop and test liquid rocket engines. After departing Thiokol, Williams was employed at Grumman Aircraft, where he would work from 1961 to 1986. At Grumman, Williams played a key role in the development and production of thrusters used on the Apollo Lunar Module. During the aborted Apollo 13 mission, part of Williams' team's design proved vital to the module's survival, and the team was later thanked in person by the Apollo 13 crew. Williams would go on to conduct business for Grumman abroad, and would later rise to be vice president of marketing at Grumman International.

Williams earned an MBA from St. John's University in 1981. Following his retirement from Grumman in 1986, Williams became a professor at St. John's University, teaching marketing. He continued to teach for 12 years.

== Death ==
Williams died in 2005. His name is present on the National Air and Space Museum's wall of honor.

== Personal life ==
Williams married Doris Louise Reid in 1942. The couple had three children.

Williams was a member of the American Rocket Society and the Nigerian-American Chamber of Commerce. He was awarded with an associate fellowship from the American Institute of Aeronautics and Astronautics for his work in the 1950s.

He was a lifetime supporter of the NAACP.
