= Samuel Jasper Loring =

Samuel Jasper Loring (1914-1963) was an American aeronautical engineer with Chance Vought and later Hamilton Standard who worked on various aspects of the aeroelastic flutter problem.

== Biography ==
He was born in 1914 to Mabel A. (Cross) and Henry Delano Loring. He graduated from the Massachusetts Institute of Technology in 1936. He was awarded the Wright Brothers Medal in 1941 and the ASME Admiral George W. Melville Medal in 1950. He died in 1963.
