= Edward Curtis Wells =

American aviation executive

- Born: August 26, 1910; Boise, Idaho, U.S.
- Died: July 1, 1986 (aged 75); Bellevue, Washington, U.S.
- Employer: Boeing Company

Edward Curtis Wells (August 26, 1910 – July 1, 1986) was an American aviation executive. He was senior vice president and served on the board of directors of Boeing Company. He helped to design the Boeing 707, 747 and the B-17 Flying Fortress. He was known as the "elder statesman of aviation".

== Biography ==
Wells was born in Boise, Idaho, on August 26, 1910, and graduated from Grant High School in Portland, Oregon. He attended Willamette University for two years then attended Stanford University where he graduated Phi Beta Kappa in 1931 with a Bachelor of Arts degree in engineering.

Wells joined Boeing Company's engineering staff in 1931 and was named Boeing's chief engineer in 1943.

Wells died on July 1, 1986, in Bellevue, Washington.

== Honors ==
- Daniel Guggenheim Medal (1980).
- Fawcett Aviation Award (1944).
- Lawrence Sperry Award from the Institute of the Aeronautical Sciences (1942).
