= Eugene E. Covert =

American aeronautical engineer (1926–2015)

- Born: February 6, 1926; Rapid City, South Dakota
- Died: January 15, 2015 (aged 88)
- Education: University of Minnesota; Massachusetts Institute of Technology
- Known for: Wind tunnel magnetic suspension systems Rogers Commission
- Awards: Daniel Guggenheim Medal (2005)
- Scientific career
- Fields: Aerodynamics; Aeronautics; Aeronautical Engineering
- Workplaces: Massachusetts Institute of Technology
- Thesis: On some fundamentals in magneto-fluid-mechanics (1958)
- Doctoral advisor: Morton Finston

Eugene Edzards Covert (February 6, 1926 – January 15, 2015) was an aeronautics specialist born in Rapid City, South Dakota credited with the world's first practical wind tunnel magnetic suspension system, and was a member of the Rogers Commission. In the 1970s he was the chief scientist of the US Air Force and technical director of the European Office of Aerospace Research and Development.

== Education ==
Covert graduated from the University of Minnesota in 1946.

He received a Masters in Aeronautical Engineering in 1948.

In 1958, he received his doctorate from the Massachusetts Institute of Technology.

== Honors ==
- Exceptional Civilian Service Award from the United States Air Force (1973, 1976)
- University Educator of the Year, Engineering Science Division, American Society of Aerospace Education, National Aeronautic Association (1980)
- NASA Public Service Award (1981)
- MIT Graduate Student Council Outstanding Teacher Aware (1985)
- American Institute of Aeronautics and Astronautics Ground Testing Aware (1990)
- Advisory Group for Aerospace Research and Development von Karman Medal (1990)
- American Institute of Aeronautics and Astronautics W. F. Durand Lectureship (1992)
- Daniel Guggenheim Medal for aviation (2005)
- Outstanding Achievement Award from the University of Minnesota (2007)
