= Clinton H. Havill =

Clinton Hunter Havill (November 25, 1892 – March 25, 1953) was an American naval officer and early aeronautical engineer, who worked in the areas of aerodynamic drag and airships.

== Biography ==
He was born on November 25, 1892, in Rochester, New York, to Eric E. Havill and Lydia A. Parkes. He graduated from the United States Naval Academy in 1916. He held a commission as a lieutenant commander in the United States Navy. He was the inaugural recipient of the Wright Brothers Medal in 1928 for work on the performance of aircraft propellers. By 1937 he was living in South Orange, New Jersey. He died on March 25, 1953, in his office at Curtiss-Wright Corporation in Carlstadt, New Jersey.
