= Marion O. McKinney Jr. =

Marion O'Dell McKinney Jr. (July 24, 1921 – August 3, 1999) was a scientist at Langley Memorial Aeronautical Laboratory, who researched a wide variety of aerospace topics, including personal aircraft, dynamics, and aircraft configurations. Like many of his contemporaries, he conducted secret war-related research during World War II, the results of which were later declassified.

== Biography ==
He was born on July 24, 1921, in Chattanooga, Tennessee to Marion O'Dell McKinney Sr. and Louise Blackwell. He graduated from Georgia Institute of Technology in 1942 with a degree in aeronautical engineering. In 1944 he married Betty Garner.

He was awarded the Wright Brothers Medal in 1964 for work on the aerodynamics of V/STOL aircraft.

He was the assistant chief of the Subsonic-Transonic Division of NASA. He retired from NASA in 1980.

He died on August 3, 1999, at Hampton General Hospital in Hampton Roads, Virginia.

== See also ==
- Research Papers from the NASA Technical Reports Server
