= Orville A. Wheelon =

Orville Albert Wheelon (June 12, 1906 – February 9, 1966) was an aeronautical engineer who invented the Verson-Wheelon process for aircraft sheet-metal forming and who was one of the first to use titanium in modern aircraft construction. The latter work earned him the Wright Brothers Medal in 1951.

His son is Albert D. Wheelon, a physicist and aerospace executive.
