= Julian Wolkovitch =

Julian Wolkovitch (January 8, 1932 – January 7, 1991) was an engineer who pioneered the modern joined-wing aircraft concept. He won the Wright Brothers Medal in 1966 for a paper on control issues in helicopters.
