= Kermit Van Every =

American aerospace engineer

Kermit Van Every (March 5, 1915 – November 20, 1998) was a noted American aeronautical engineer best known for his work in the area of very high-speed flight. He was a fellow of the American Institute of Aeronautics and Astronautics and had the unusual distinction of receiving the Wright Brothers Medal twice, in 1948 and 1958.

Van Every was a native of San Jose, California. In 1937 he transferred from San Jose State University to Stanford University, where he earned his undergraduate and aeronautical engineering degrees in 1938 and 1939 respectively, and was elected to the honorary science fraternity Sigma Xi.

Van Every worked for Douglas Aircraft Company for 25 years, ultimately serving as Chief Aeronautical Engineer, in which role he won widespread respect for leading the design of high-speed aircraft that set several speed and altitude records, including the Douglas Skyrocket with Ed Heinemann. After leaving Douglas, he became responsible for aircraft design at Northrop and General Dynamics Aircraft Co., and eventually headed up his own aeronautical consulting company in San Diego located near Point Loma. He died November 20, 1998, in Menlo Park, California.

== Selected writings ==
- Ed Heinemann, Rosario Rausa, and Kermit Van Every, Aircraft Design, Nautical and Aviation Publishing Co., Baltimore, 1985.
