= Dwight Henry Bennett =

Dwight Henry Bennett (November 19, 1917 – July 10, 2002) was an aeronautical engineer and one of the early developers of the control configured vehicle (CCV) concept. He won the Wright Brothers Medal in 1972 with R. P. Johannes for the paper Combat Capabilities and Versatility Through CCV, discussing its applications.

== Biography ==
He was born on November 19, 1917, in Oklahoma City. Bennett graduated with a BS in Mechanical engineering (ME) from Caltech in 1940, married the former Katherine Mason, and had 3 children. He joined the San Diego Division of Convair, where he worked on the Sea Dart, F-102, F-104 amongst others, for 23 years ultimately rising to Vice President and Assistant to the General Manager. He had flown Mach 2 by 1959. He was Vice President of Aero Commander Aircraft from 1963 through 1964 before moving on to McDonnell Aircraft where he worked on the Breguet 941/McDonnell 188 S.T.O.L. Transport, F-4 Phantom, ending with the F/A-18 Hornet at Northrup, as a director of program engineering. Bennett was also an active flight instructor in all ratings for forty years. He died on July 10, 2002, at the age of 84, in San Diego, California.

== Awards ==
- Wright Brothers Medal, 1972
