= Wright Brothers Medal =

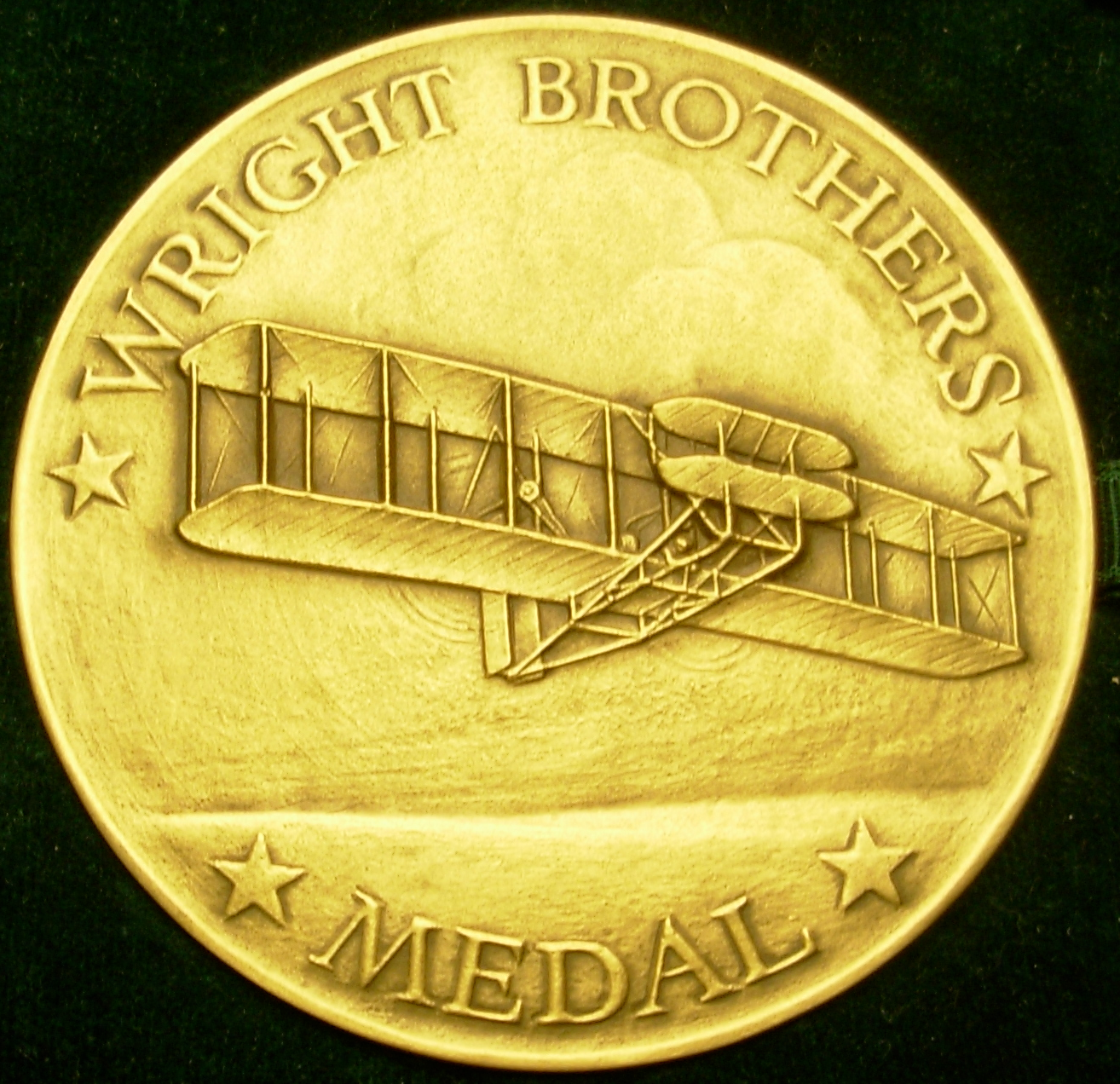
- Awarded for: Contributions to aerospace engineering
- Country: United States
- Presented by: SAE
- First award: 1927
- Website: https://www.sae.org/participate/awards/wright-brothers-medal

The Wright Brothers Medal was conceived of in 1924 by the Dayton Section of the Society of Automotive Engineers, and the SAE established it in 1927 to recognize individuals who have made notable contributions in the engineering, design, development, or operation of air and space vehicles. The award is based on contributed research papers.

The award honors Wilbur and Orville Wright as the first successful builders of heavier-than-air craft, and includes an image of the Wright Flyer, the plane which they flew in 1903 at Kitty Hawk, North Carolina.

== Awardees and research topics: 1928-1975 ==
- 1928 Clinton Hunter Havill - Aircraft Propellers.
- 1929 Ralph Hazlett Upson - Wings - A Coordinated System of Basic Design.
- 1930 Theodore Paul Wright - The Development of a Safe Airplane - The Curtis Tanager.
- 1931 Stephen Joseph Zand: A Study of Airplane and Instrument Board Vibration
- 1932 Edward Pearson Warner: The Rational Specifications of Airplane Load Factors
- 1933 Eastman Nixon Jacobs: The Aerodynamics of Wing Sections for Airplanes
- 1934 Rex Buren Beisel, A. L. MacClain, and F. M. Thomas: Cowling and Cooling of Radial Air-Cooled Aircraft Engines
- 1935 William Littlewood: Operating Requirements for Transport Airplanes
- 1936 R. J. Minshall, J. K. Ball, and F. P. Laudan: Problems in the Design and Construction of Large Aircraft
- 1937 Richard V. Rhode - Gust Loads on Airplanes
- 1938 no award given
- 1939 Kenneth A. Browne: Dynamic Suspension - A Method of Aircraft Engine Mounting
- 1940 Clarence Leonard Johnson: Rudder Control Problems on Four-Engined Airplanes
- 1941 Samuel Jasper Loring: General Approach to the Flutter Problem
- 1942 Charles R. Strang: Progress in Structural Design Through Strain-Gage Technique
- 1943 Costas E. Pappas: The Determination of Fuselage Moments
- 1944 Kenneth Campbell: Engine Cooling Fan Theory and Practice
- 1945 Myron Tribus: Report on Development and Application of Heated Wings
- 1946 Frederick Van Horne Judd: A Systematic Approach to the Aerodynamic Design of Radial Engine Installations
- 1947 Henry B. Gibbons: Experiences of an Aircraft Manufacturer with Sandwich Material
- 1948 Kermit Van Every: Aerodynamics of High Speed Airplanes
- 1949 Homer J. Wood and Frederick Dallenbach: Auxiliary Gas Turbines for Pneumatic Power in Aircraft Applications
- 1950 James Charles Floyd: The Avro C102 Jetliner
- 1951 Orville Albert Wheelon: Design Methods and Manufacturing Techniques with Titanium
- 1952 W. J. Kunz, Jr.: A New Technique for Investigating Jet Engine Compressor Stall and Other Transient Characteristics
- 1953 D. N. Meyers and Z. Ciolkosz: Matching the Characteristics of Helicopters and Shaft Turbines
- 1954 John M. Tyler and E. C. Perry, Jr.: Jet Noise
- 1955 Wendell E. Reed: A New Approach to Turbojet and Ramjet Engine Controls
- 1956 Charles Horton Zimmerman: Some General Considerations Concerning VTOL Aircraft
- 1957 Alf F. Ensrud: Problems in the Application of High Strength Steel Alloys in the Design of Supersonic Aircraft
- 1958 Kermit Van Every: Design Problems of Very High Speed Flight
- 1959 Milford G. Childers: Preliminary Design Considerations for the Structure of a Trisonic Transport
- 1960 Ferdinand B. Greatrex: By-Pass Engine Noise
- 1961 Carleton M. Mears and Robert L. Peterson: Mechanization on Minimum-Energy Automatic Lunar Soft-Landing Systems
- 1962 Robert P. Rhodes, Jr., D. E. Chriss, and Philip M. Rubins: Effect of Heat Release on Flow Parameters in Shock Induced Combustion
- 1963 Sitaram Rao Valluri, James B. Glassco, and George Eugene Bockrath: Further Considerations of a Theory of Crack Propagation in Metal Fatigue
- 1964 Marion O'Dell McKinney, Jr., Richard E. Kuhn, and John P. Reeder: Aerodynamics and Flying Qualities of Jet V/STOL Airplanes
- 1965 W. W. Williams, G. K. Williams, and W. C. J. Garrard: Soft and Rough Field Landing Gears
- 1966 Julian Wolkovitch: An Introduction to Hover Dynamics
- 1967 John A. McKillop: Flutter Characteristics of the Slap Tail
- 1968 Leonard J. Nestor and Lawrence Maggitti, Jr.: Effects of Dynamic Environments on Fuel Tank Flammability
- 1969 W. N. Reddisch, A. E. Sabroff, P. C. Wheeler, and J. G. Zaremba: A Semi-Active Gravity Gradient Stabilization System
- 1970 J. Hong: Advanced Bonding for Large Aircraft
- 1971 no award given
- 1972 Dwight Henry Bennett and Robert P. Johannes: Combat Capabilities and Versatility Through CCV
- 1973 Richard E. Hayden: Fundamental Aspects of Noise Reduction From Powered Lift Devices
- 1974 Michael J. Wendl, Gordon G. Grose, John L. Porter, and Ralph V. Pruitt: Flight/Propulsion Control Integration Aspects of Energy Management
- 1975 John A. Alic and H. Archang: Comparison of Fracture and Fatigue Properties of Clad 7075-T6 Aluminum in Monolithic and Laminated Forms

== Awardees ==
Source: SAE International

- 1976 no award given
- 1977 - Raymond M. Hicks and Garret N. Vanderplaats
- 1978 no award given
- 1979 Gary E. Erickson, Dale J. Lorincz, William A. Moore, and Andrew M. Skow: Effects on Forebody, Wing and Wing-Body-LEX Flowfields in High Angle of Attack Aerodynamics
- 1980 Walter S. Cremens: Thermal Expansion Molding Process for Aircraft Composite Structures
- 1981 Raymond M. Hicks: Transonic Wing Design Using Potential Flow Codes -- Successes and Failures
- 1982 Andre Fort and J. J. Speyer: Human Factors Approach in Certification Flight Test
- 1983 Carol A. Simpson: Integrated Voice Controls and Speech Displays for Rotorcraft Mission Management
- 1984 Robert J. Englar and James H. Nichols Jr.
- 1985 Charles W. Boppe
- 1986 James A. Hare: Increasing the Node Shifting Capability of Fixed Velocity Upper Stage Payloads using Slightly Elliptic Drift Orbits
- 1987 Charles P. Blankenship and Robert J. Hayduk
- 1988 Benton C. Clark III
- 1989 Charles W. Boppe and Warren H. Davis
- 1990 Mariann F. Brown and Susan Schentrup
- 1991 Lourdes M. Birckelbaw and Lloyd D. Corliss: Handling Qualities Results of an Initial Geared Flap Tilt Wing Piloted Simulation
- 1992 G. J. Bastiaans, Steve D. Braymen, S. G. Burns, Shelley J. Coldiron, R. S. Deinhammer, William J. Deninger, R. P. O'Toole, Marc D. Porter, and H. R. Shanks: Novel Approaches to the Construction of Miniaturized Analytical Instrumentation
- 1993 no award given
- 1994 Timothy Geels, Tom McDavid, Greg Robel, and Tze Siu: DGPS Precision Landing Simulation
- 1995 Robert R. Wilkins Jr.: Designing the Conceptual Flight Deck for a Short Haul Civil Transport/Civil Tiltrotor
- 1996 B. A. Moravec and Michael W. Patnoe
- 1997 James R. Fuller: Evolution And Future Development Of Airplane Gust Loads
- 1998 Robert S. McCann, Becky L. Hooey, Bonny Parke, Anthony D. Andre, David C. Foyle, and Barbara G. Kanki
- 1999 Jeremy S. Agte, Robert Sandusky, and Jaroslaw Sobieski
- 2000 no award given
- 2001 Maurizio Apra, Marcello D'Amore, Maria Sabrina Sarto, Alberto Scarlatti, and Valeria Volpi: VAM-LIFE: Virtual Aircraft ElectroMagnetic Lightning Indirect Effect Evaluation
- 2002 Gary L. Boyd, Alfred W. Fuller, and Jack Moy: Hybrid-Ceramic Circumferential Carbon Ring Seal
- 2003 Timothy J. Bencic, Colin S. Bidwell, Michael Papadakis, Arief Rachman, and See-Cheuk Wong: An Experimental Investigation of SLD Impingement on Airfoils and Simulated Ice Shapes
- 2004 Philip Freeman: A Robust Method of Countersink Inspection Using Machine Vision
- 2005 John W. Fisher, Michael T. Flynn, Eric J. Litwiller, and Martin Reinhard: Lyophilization for Water Recovery III, System Design
- 2006 James R. Akse, James E. Atwater, Roger Dahl, John W. Fisher, Frank C. Garmon, Neal M. Hadley, Richard R. Wheeler Jr, Thomas W. Williams: Development and Testing of a Microwave Powered Solid Waste Stabilization and Water Recovery System
- 2007 Peter O. Andreychuk, Leonid S Bobe, Nikolay N. Protasov, Nikolay N. Samsonov, Yury Sinyak, and Vladimir M. Skuratov: Water Recovery on the International Space Station: The Perspectives of Space Stations' Water Supply Systems
- 2008 Carl Jack Ercol: Return to Mercury: An Overview of the MESSENGER Spacecraft Thermal Control System Design and Up-to-Date Flight Performance
- 2009 Atle Honne, John T James, Dirk Kampf, Kristin Kaspersen, Dr Thomas Limero, Dr Ariel V. Macatangay, Dr Herbert Mosebach, Paul D Mudgett, Henrik Schumann-Olsen, Wolfgang Supper, and Gijsbert Tan: Evaluation of ANITA Air Monitoring on the International Space Station
- 2010 Henrik Kihlman, and Magnus Engström: Flexapods - Flexible Tooling at SAAB for Building the NEURON Aircraft
- 2011 Matthew Barker, Luke Hickson, Joeseph K-W Lam, Stephen Paul Tomlinson, and Darran Venn: Mathematical Model of Water Contamination in Aircraft Fuel Tanks
- 2012 Jerry Bieszczad, Michael Izenson, George Ford Kiwada, Patrick J Magari: Ultra- Compact Power System for Long-Endurance Small Unmanned Aerial Systems
- 2013 Ing Rafael Fernandes de Oliveira
- 2014 Troy Beechner, Kyle Ian Merical, Paul Yelvington
- 2015 no award given
- 2016 Tadas P. Bartkus, Peter Struk, Jen-Ching Tsao
- 2017 Christian Boehlmann, Wolfgang Hintze, Philip Koch, Christian Moeller, Hans Christian Schmidt, Jörg Wollnack
- 2019 Yuzhi Jin, Yuping Qian, Yangjun Zhang, Weilin Zhuge - Tsinghua University

== See also ==
- Wright Brothers Memorial Trophy
- List of aviation awards
- List of space technology awards
- List of engineering awards
- Prizes named after people
