= Arthur Emmons Raymond =

- Born: March 24, 1899; Boston
- Died: March 22, 1999 (aged 99); Santa Monica, California
- Education: Harvard University, MIT
- Scientific career
- Fields: Aeronautical Engineering
- Workplaces: Douglas Aircraft Company, Rand Corporation

Arthur Emmons Raymond (March 24, 1899, in Boston Massachusetts – March 22, 1999, in Santa Monica, California) was an aeronautical engineer who led the team that designed the DC-3.

Raymond grew up in Pasadena, California, the son of the owner of a luxury hotel. He completed a B.A. at Harvard University, and a M.S. in aeronautical engineering at MIT in 1921.

Raymond spent his entire career at the Douglas Aircraft Company. Beginning as a metal fitter, he rose to the rank of chief engineer, contributing to the design of all Douglas airliners from the DC-1 to the DC-8. During World War II, he helped managed the huge effort that produced tens of thousands of aircraft for that war.

Raymond is best known as the lead designer of the DC-3, "The Plane That Changed the World," the first airliner that could break even hauling passengers without a government subsidy and without carrying mail. The military equivalent of the DC-3 was the C-47. In Europe, the DC-3 was known as the "Dakota." Raymond's grandson Stephen has said: "In the DC-3, he did almost everything. He knew every bolt and screw in that plane." About 10,600 DC-3s and C-47s were eventually built between 1934 and 1945, making it the most produced airliner of all time. At the time of Raymond's death, about 2,000 DC-3s were still flying and about 400 were still in commercial service.

After retiring from Douglas in 1960, NASA put Raymond in charge of supervising the outside contractors on Project Gemini and Project Apollo until 1969. When Boeing and other aerospace firms proposed in the late 1960s to build a supersonic airliner with substantial subsidies from the US government, Raymond argued that the plane was not commercially viable. The USA government ceased subsidizing the design of the American supersonic transport in 1971, whereupon it died.

At the end of World War II, Raymond proposed to the USAF that they create an organization to think about intercontinental warfare. That organization became the Rand Corporation, of which he was a founding member. He was also a founding member of the National Academy of Engineering. In 1991 he received the National Air and Space Museum Lifetime Achievement Trophy.

He died at age 99.

Stephen Raymond said of his grandfather: "He was always known as the kind of person who spoke truth to power. They depended on him to unearth the things that were wrong from the spinmeisters who were saying everything was dandy."
