= List of members of the National Academy of Engineering (aerospace) =

This list is a subsection of the List of members of the National Academy of Engineering, which includes members and international members of the United States National Academy of Engineering, living and deceased, each affiliated with one of the academy's disciplinary sections. Members are listed under their primary section, and each entry gives the person's name, primary institution, and election year. For deceased members, the year of death is noted.

== Aerospace ==
Name	Institution	Year elected
H. Norman Abramson (died 2022)	Southwest Research Institute	1976
Malcolm J. Abzug (died 2007)	TRW Inc.	1996
Laurence J. Adams (died 2008)	Martin Marietta	1988
Paul R. Adams	Precision CastParts	2013
Richard E. Adams (died 2007)	General Dynamics	1985
Krishan K. Ahuja	Georgia Institute of Technology Research Institute	2019
James F. Albaugh	The Boeing Company	2011
Edward C. (Pete) Aldridge	U.S. Department of Defense	2007
Kyle T. Alfriend	Texas A&M University-College Station	1999
Lew Allen Jr. (died 2010)	NASA Jet Propulsion Laboratory, Caltech	1978
William A. Anders (died 2024)	Heritage Flight Museum	1984
John D. Anderson, Jr.	Smithsonian Institution	2010
Minoru S. (Sam) Araki (died 2023)	Lockheed Martin	1990
Brian Argrow	University of Colorado Boulder	2022
John Argyris (died 2004)	University of Stuttgart	1986
Neil A. Armstrong (died 2012)	EDO Corporation	1978
Irving L. Ashkenas (died 2011)	Systems Technology, Inc.	1992
Holt Ashley (died 2006)	Stanford University	1970
Satya N. Atluri (died 2023)	Texas Tech University	1996
Donald J. Atwood (died 1994)	Atwood Associates, Inc.	1980
J. Leland Atwood (died 1999)	The Boeing Company	1974
Norman R. Augustine	Lockheed Martin	1983
MiMi Aung	Amazon Kuiper Systems LLC	2022
Wanda Austin	The Aerospace Corporation	2008
Monika Auweter-Kurtz	German Aerospace Academy (ASA)	2009
Penina Axelrad	University of Colorado Boulder	2019
James P. Bagian	University of Michigan	2000
Mary Baker (died 2021)	ATA Engineering Inc.	2019
William F. Ballhaus, Jr.	The Aerospace Corporation	1988
William F. Ballhaus, Sr. (died 2013)	Beckman Coulter	1973
Siva S. Banda	Air Force Research Laboratory - Wright-Patterson Air Force Base, Ohio	2004
Marcel L. J. Barrere (died 1996)	National Office of Aerospace Studies and Research of France	1984
Steven J. Battel	Battel Engineering	2016
Richard H. Battin (died 2014)	Massachusetts Institute of Technology	1974
Meyer J. Benzakein (died 2023)	The Ohio State University	2001
Roger H. Beteille (died 2019)	Airbus Industrie	1992
Paul Bevilaqua	Lockheed Martin Skunk Works	2005
Jeff Bezos	Amazon.com	2018
Frederick S. Billig (died 2006)	Pyrodyne Inc.	1995
Graeme A. Bird (died 2018)	GAB Consulting Pty. Ltd.	1996
Raymond L. Bisplinghoff (died 1985)	Tyco Laboratories, Inc.	1965
Lars James Blackmore	SpaceX	2026
B. Paul Blasingame (died 2015)	General Motors Corporation	1971
Seymour M. Bogdonoff (died 2005)	Princeton University	1977
Oliver C. Boileau (died 2007)	Northrop Grumman	1979
Charles F. Bolden	The Charles F. Bolden Group LLC	2020
Jay P. Boris	U.S. Naval Research Laboratory	2009
George H. Born (died 2016)	University of Colorado Boulder	2004
Kevin G. Bowcutt	The Boeing Company	2015
Rodney Dale Welch Bowersox	Texas A&M University	2025
Iain Boyd	University of Colorado Boulder	2026
Robert D. Braun	Johns Hopkins University Applied Physics Laboratory	2014
Yvonne C. Brill (died 2013)	Independent consultant	1987
James E. Broadwell (died 2018)	TRW Inc.	1987
Robert Bromberg (died 1999)	TRW Inc.	1969
John R. Brophy	NASA Jet Propulsion Laboratory, Caltech	2024
Alan C. Brown (died 2022)	Lockheed Corporation	1992
Alison K. Brown	NAVSYS Corporation	2020
Tory Bruno	Blue Origin	2023
Arthur E. Bryson	Stanford University	1970
Bernard Budiansky (died 1999)	Harvard University	1976
Hsiao-hua Burke	MIT Lincoln Laboratory	2024
James R. Burnett (died 2012)	TRW Inc.	1975
Dale E. Burton	Northrop Grumman	2007
Wesley G. Bush	Northrop Grumman	2015
Dennis M. Bushnell (died 2025)	NASA Langley Research Center	1998
Henri Gaston Busignies (died 1981)	ITT Corporation	1966
Sebastien Candel	CentraleSupélec	2009
Graham V. Candler	University of Minnesota	2020
M. Elizabeth Cannon	University of Calgary	2011
Robert H. Cannon, Jr. (died 2017)	Stanford University	1973
Brian Cantwell	Stanford University	2004
Renso L. Caporali	Grumman	1993
Robert P. Caren (died 2017)	Lockheed Corporation	1989
Richard M. Carlson (died 2004)	Independent consultant	1990
John R. Casani (died 2025)	NASA Jet Propulsion Laboratory, Caltech	1989
John F. Cashen	Northrop Grumman	1986
Corbett Caudill	GE Aircraft Engines	2003
Joseph V. Charyk (died 2016)	COMSAT Corporation	1973
Hsien K. Cheng (died 2007)	University of Southern California	1988
Igor Cherepinsky	Lockheed Martin	2025
Gorimir G. Chernyi (died 2012)	Russian Academy of Sciences	1998
Inderjit Chopra	University of Maryland, College Park	2023
Arthur C. Clarke (died 2008)	Independent consultant	1986
John-Paul Clarke	The University of Texas at Austin	2026
Francis H. Clauser (died 2013)	California Institute of Technology	1970
Noel Thomas Clemens	University of Texas	2024
Richard J. Coar (died 2013)	United Technologies Corporation	1984
Vance D. Coffman	Lockheed Martin	1997
Aaron Cohen (died 2010)	Texas A&M University-College Station	1988
Theodore Colbert III	The Boeing Company	2024
Julian D. Cole (died 1999)	Rensselaer Polytechnic Institute	1976
Donald E. Coles (died 2013)	California Institute of Technology	1984
Philip M. Condit	The Boeing Company	1985
Thomas B. Cook, Jr. (died 2013)	Sandia National Laboratories	1981
George E. Cooper (died 2016)	NASA Ames Research Center	1992
Stanley Corrsin (died 1986)	Johns Hopkins University	1980
Edgar M. Cortright (died 2014)	NASA Langley Research Center	1973
Benjamin A. Cosgrove (died 2006)	Boeing Commercial Airplanes	1992
Eugene E. Covert (died 2015)	Massachusetts Institute of Technology	1980
Natalie W. Crawford (died 2025)	The RAND Corporation	2001
Edward F. Crawley	Massachusetts Institute of Technology	1998
Robert L. Crippen	Thiokol Propulsion	2012
Luigi Crocco (died 1986)	Central School of France	1979
James H. Crocker	Lockheed Martin	2017
David E. Crow	University of Connecticut	1998
Christine Mann Darden	NASA Langley Research Center	2023
Marcel Dassault (died 1986)	Dassault Aviation SA	1976
Ruth A. David	ANSER (Analytic Services Inc.)	2002
Frank W. Davis (died 2001)	General Dynamics	1967
Daniel B. DeBra (died 2021)	Stanford University	1981
Satish Dhawan (died 2002)	Space Commission, Government of India	1978
[William C. Diet (died 2006)	Lockheed Corporation	1982
Paul E. Dimotakis	California Institute of Technology	2016
Coleman duPont Donaldson (died 2009)	Independent consultant	1979
Thomas F. Donohue (died 2014)	GE Aircraft Engines	1994
Jean-Jacques Dordain	European Space Agency	2019
Steven D. Dorfman	No affiliation	1992
Earl H. Dowell	Duke University	1993
Ann P. Dowling	University of Cambridge	2008
Mark Drela	Massachusetts Institute of Technology	2009
Eric H. Ducharme	GE Aerospace	2017
Bonnie J. Dunbar	Texas A&M University	2002
Edsel D. Dunford (died 2008)	TRW Inc.	1989
Alfred J. Eggers Jr. (died 2006)	RANN, Inc.	1972
Antonio L. Elias	Orbital ATK, Inc.	2001
Gerard W. Elverum (died 2025)	TRW Inc.	1987
Gordon R. England	V1 Analytical Solutions	2012
Alan H. Epstein	Pratt & Whitney	1999
Heinz Erzberger	Universities Space Research Association	2010
Maxime A. Faget (died 2004)	Space Industries Inc.	1970
Charbel Farhat	Stanford University	2013
Robert W. Farquhar (died 2015)	KinetX Aerospace	2012
Thea Feyereisen	Honeywell Aerospace	2025
John E. Ffowcs Williams (died 2020)	University of Cambridge	1995
Stephen N. Finger	Pratt & Whitney	2009
Daniel J. Fink (died 2012)	D.J. Fink Associates, Inc.	1974
Alexander H. Flax (died 2014)	Independent consultant	1967
Donald C. Fraser	The Charles Stark Draper Laboratory, Inc.	1985
Robert A. Fuhrman (died 2009)	Lockheed Corporation	1976
Michimasa Fujino	Honda Aircraft Corporation	2017
Giuseppe Gabrielli (died 1987)	Fiat Aviazione S.p.A.	1983
Alec Damian Gallimore	Duke University	2019
Jacques S. Gansler (died 2018)	The Gansler Group	2002
Alon Gany	Technion-Israel Institute of Technology	2014
Richard L. Garwin (died 2025)	IBM Thomas J. Watson Research Center	1978
Welko E. Gasich (died 2022)	Northrop Corporation	1979
Joseph G. Gavin Jr. (died 2010)	Grumman	1974
Arthur Gelb (died 2023)	Four Sigma Corporation	2010
William H. Gerstenmaier	SpaceX	2018
Ivan A. Getting (died 2003)	The Aerospace Corporation	1968
Robert R. Gilruth (died 2000)	National Aeronautics and Space Administration	1968
Irvin Glassman (died 2019)	Princeton University	1996
George J. Gleghorn (died 2021)	TRW Inc.	1990
Yuriy Gmirya	Lockheed Martin	2026
Martin Goland (died 1997)	Southwest Research Institute	1967
Daniel S. Goldin	KnuEdge	1998
Marvin E. Goldstein	NASA Glenn Research Center	1990
George S. Graff (died 2016)	McDonnell Douglas	1981
Edward M. Greitzer	Massachusetts Institute of Technology	1995
Michael D. Griffin	LogiQ, Inc.	2006
Bacharuddin Jusuf Habibie (died 2019)	Habibie Center	1986
Arnold Hall (died 2000)	Hawker Siddeley Canada Inc.	1976
Kenneth Charles Hall	Duke University	2020
William T. Hamilton (died 2002)	The Boeing Company	1978
Thomas L. Hampton (died 2017)	Independent consultant	1997
Grant L. Hansen (died 2008)	System Development Corporation	1977
R. John Hansman Jr.	Massachusetts Institute of Technology	2013
Wesley L. Harris	Massachusetts Institute of Technology	1995
Daniel M. Hart	HarTechnologies, LLC	2022
Eddy W. Hartenstein	Broadcom	2001
George A. Harter (died 2017)	TRW Inc.	1981
Daniel E. Hastings	Massachusetts Institute of Technology	2017
Robert C. Hawkins (died 2018)	GE Aircraft Engines	1985
Willis M. Hawkins (died 2004)	Lockheed Martin	1966
Tsuyoshi Hayashi (died 1998)	Research Center of Computational Mechanics, Inc. (RCCM)	1987
Wallace D. Hayes (died 2001)	Princeton University	1975
Donald P. Hearth (died 2013)	NASA Langley Research Center	1989
John M. Hedgepeth (died 2000)	Digisim Corporation	1994
Ira G. Hedrick (died 2008)	Grumman	1974
David R. Heebner (died 2003)	Heebner Associates	1999
Susan Jane Helms	Orbital Visions LLC	2020
Preston A. Henne	Gulfstream Aerospace Corporation	2004
R. Richard Heppe (died 2015)	Lockheed Martin	1982
Robert J. Hermann (died 2023)	Independent consultant	1989
Abraham Hertzberg (died 2003)	University of Washington	1976
Harry J. Hillaker (died 2009)	General Dynamics	1990
Stanley Hiller Jr. (died 2006)	Hiller Aviation Museum	1999
Chih-Ming Ho	University of California, Los Angeles	1997
David G. Hoag (died 2015)	The Charles Stark Draper Laboratory, Inc.	1979
Nicholas J. Hoff (died 1997)	Stanford University	1965
Kenneth F. Holtby (died 2013)	The Boeing Company	1979
Edward Exum Hood Jr. (died 2019)	General Electric	1980
Hans G. Hornung	California Institute of Technology	1997
John C. Houbolt (died 2014)	NASA Langley Research Center	1990
Jonathan P. How	Massachusetts Institute of Technology	2021
Kathleen Howell	Purdue University	2017
James E. Hubbard, Jr.	Texas A&M University-College Station	2016
Anthony J. Iorillo	Hughes Aircraft Company	1986
Dana Keoki Jackson	Mitre Corporation	2020
Antony Jameson	Texas A&M University	1997
George W. Jeffs (died 2019)	Rockwell International Corporation	1978
Forrester T. Johnson	The Boeing Company	2000
Robert L. Johnson (died 2016)	McDonnell Douglas	1976
Wayne Robert Johnson	National Aeronautics and Space Administration	2025
Christopher Tyler Jones	The Leadership Compass	2021
Robert T. Jones (died 1999)	Stanford University	1973
Thomas V. Jones (died 2014)	Northrop Corporation	1986
Donald J. Jordan (died 2008)	Pratt & Whitney	1976
David L. Joyce	General Electric Aviation	2014
John L. Junkins	Texas A&M University-College Station	1996
Charles H. Kaman (died 2011)	Kaman Corporation	1967
Paul G. Kaminski	Technovation, Inc.	1994
Arthur Kantrowitz (died 2008)	Dartmouth College	1977
Ann R. Karagozian	University of California, Los Angeles	2018
Abe E. Karem	Karem Aircraft, Inc.	2010
Pradman P. Kaul (died 2025)	Hughes Communications Inc.	2004
Thomas J. Kelly (died 2002)	Independent consultant	1991
Jack L. Kerrebrock (died 2019)	Massachusetts Institute of Technology	1978
Bernard L. Koff (died 2021)	TurboVision	1988
Don R. Kozlowski (died 2015)	The Boeing Company	2000
Christopher C. Kraft, Jr. (died 2019)	Independent consultant	1970
Eugene Francis Kranz	NASA Johnson Space Center	2024
James N. Krebs (died 2022)	GE Aircraft Engines	1982
Kent Kresa	Northrop Grumman	1997
Roger A. Krone	Leidos, Inc.	2021
Ilan Kroo	Stanford University	2005
Hitoshi Kuninaka	Japan Aerospace Exploration Agency	2025
Walter B. LaBerge (died 2004)	Institute for Advanced Technology	1987
Sau-Hai Lam (died 2018)	Princeton University	2006
John S. Langford	Electra.Aero, Inc.	2018
J. Halcombe Laning (died 2012)	The Charles Stark Draper Laboratory, Inc.	1983
Nicholas D. Lappos	Lockheed Martin	2022
Shelley K. Lavender	The Boeing Company	2021
Eugene Lavretsky	The Boeing Company	2024
Chung K. Law	Princeton University	2002
Jerome F. Lederer (died 2004)	Flight Safety Foundation	1967
B. Gentry Lee	NASA Jet Propulsion Laboratory, Caltech	2021
Claire Leon	United States Space Force	2021
David S. Lewis Jr. (died 2003)	General Dynamics	1971
Paul A. Libby (died 2021)	University of California, San Diego	1999
Robert H. Liebeck (died 2026)	The Boeing Company	1992
Harold Liebowitz (died 2004)	The George Washington University	1975
Hans W. Liepmann (died 2009)	California Institute of Technology	1965
Timothy Charles Lieuwen	Georgia Institute of Technology	2018
Robert M. Lightfoot Jr.	Lockheed Martin Space Systems	2026
M. James Lighthill (died 1998)	University College London	1977
Peter W. Likins	University of Arizona	1984
Alexander C. Livanos	Northrop Grumman	2008
Robert G. Loewy (died 2025)	Georgia Institute of Technology	1971
Harvard Lomax (died 1999)	NASA Ames Research Center	1987
R. Noel Longuemare, Jr.	Longuemare Consultants, Inc.	2003
Alan M. Lovelace (died 2018)	Independent consultant	1974
William R. Lucas (died 2025)	NASA George C. Marshall Space Flight Center	1978
Kathryn Lueders	SpaceX Starbase	2022
John L. Lumley (died 2015)	Cornell University	1991
Elizabeth Hefley Lund	Boeing Commercial Airplanes	2026
Bruce T. Lundin (died 2006)	NASA Glenn Research Center	1976
Lester L. Lyles	No affiliation	2011
Verne Larry Lynn (died 2020)	Independent consultant	2006
Robert W. MacCormack	Stanford University	1992
Artur Mager (died 2016)	Independent consultant	1977
Sandra H. Magnus	AstroPlanetview, LLC	2022
Joanne M. Maguire	Lockheed Martin Space Systems	2011
Lucien C. Malavard (died 1990)	Universite de Paris	1980
James W. Mar (died 2017)	Massachusetts Institute of Technology	1981
Frank E. Marble (died 2014)	California Institute of Technology	1974
Hans Mark (died 2021)	The University of Texas at Austin	1976
Amable Liñán Martinez (died 2025)	Polytechnic University of Madrid	2015
James G. Maser	Aerojet Rocketdyne	2023
Stephen H. Maslen (died 2015)	Martin Marietta	1987
William J. McCroskey (died 2023)	U.S. Army Aviation and Missile Command	1996
Michael McCune	Pratt & Whitney	2026
Henry McDonald (died 2021)	NASA Ames Research Center	2000
Sanford N. McDonnell (died 2012)	McDonnell Douglas	1985
Laura J. McGill	Sandia National Laboratories	2019
Howard Elton McKenzie	The Boeing Company	2026
John L. McLucas (died 2002)	Independent consultant	1969
Duane T. McRuer (died 2007)	Systems Technology, Inc.	1988
Lawrence M. Mead, Jr (died 2012)	Grumman	1988
Pamela Ann Melroy	National Aeronautics and Space Administration	2021
Ruben F. Mettler (died 2006)	TRW Inc.	1965
Russell G. Meyerand Jr. (died 2003)	United Technologies Corporation	1978
Angelo Miele (died 2016)	Rice University	1994
Martin M. Mikulas, Jr.	National Institute of Aerospace	1999
Richard B. Miles	Texas A&M University	2011
Daniel N. Miller	Lockheed Martin	2022
David W. Miller	NASA Jet Propulsion Laboratory, Caltech	2023
James A. Miller (died 2021)	Argonne National Laboratory	2008
Joseph Miller (died 2007)	TRW Inc.	1991
Rene H. Miller (died 2003)	Massachusetts Institute of Technology	1968
Harold Mirels (died 2023)	The Aerospace Corporation	1986
Robert A. K. Mitchell	Robert A.K. Mitchell Consulting	2012
L. David Montague	L. David Montague Associates	1991
Mark V. Morkovin (died 2014)	Illinois Institute of Technology	1987
George E. Mueller (died 2015)	Kistler Aerospace Corporation	1967
George K. Muellner (died 2019)	The Aerospace Corporation	2015
Dennis A. Muilenburg	The Boeing Company	2018
Alan Mulally	University of Kansas	1997
E. Phillip Muntz (died 2017)	University of Southern California	1993
Earll M. Murman	Massachusetts Institute of Technology	1991
Richard Murray	California Institute of Technology	2013
Albert F. Myers (died 2016)	Myers Consulting	2006
Dale D. Myers (died 2015)	National Aeronautics and Space Administration	1974
Roger M. Myers	R. Myers Consulting, LLC	2022
Roddam Narasimha (died 2020)	Jawaharlal Nehru Centre for Advanced Scientific Research	1989
Julio A. Navarro	The Boeing Company	2021
Paul D. Nielsen	Carnegie Mellon University	2010
Alison Nordt	Lockheed Martin	2025
James G. O'Connor (died 2024)	Pratt & Whitney	1993
Malcolm R. O'Neill	United States Army	2008
Stephanie L. O'Sullivan	Office of the Director of National Intelligence	2019
Frederic C. E. Oder (died 2006)	Lockheed Martin	1980
Elaine Surick Oran	Texas A&M University-College Station	2003
Melissa E. Orme	The Boeing Company	2024
Robert B. Ormsby, Jr. (died 2013)	Lockheed Corporation	1987
Jack S. Parker (died 2013)	General Electric	1976
Norman F. Parker (died 2011)	Varian Associates, Inc.	1976
Bradford W. Parkinson	Stanford University	1990
Robert J. Parks (died 2011)	NASA Jet Propulsion Laboratory, Caltech	1973
Robert J. Patton (died 2021)	LTV Aerospace Products Group	1998
Ellen M. Pawlikowski	U.S. Air Force	2014
Nelson Pedreiro	Zoox	2022
Marc J. Pelegrin (died 2024)	ONERA Centre De Toulouse	1978
Val P. Peline (died 2017)	Stanford Telecommunications	1988
Larry F. Pellett	Lockheed Martin	2024
Stanford S. Penner (died 2016)	University of California, San Diego	1977
Courtland D. Perkins (died 2008)	National Academy of Engineering	1969
Pierre Perrier	French Academy of Technology	2004
Richard H. Petersen (died 2022)	NASA Langley Research Center	1993
Rocco A. Petrone (died 2006)	Rockwell International Corporation	1975
William H. Phillips (died 2009)	NASA Langley Research Center	1991
Theodore H. H. Pian (died 2009)	Massachusetts Institute of Technology	1988
William H. Pickering (died 2004)	Jet Propulsion Laboratory	1964
Darryll J. Pines	University of Maryland, College Park	2019
James W. Plummer (died 2013)	The Aerospace Corporation	1978
Thomas Ward Prete	Pratt & Whitney	2023
Edward W. Price (died 2012)	Georgia Institute of Technology	2000
Wilbur L. Pritchard (died 1999)	W.L. Pritchard & Co., Inc.	1995
Allen E. Puckett (died 2014)	Hughes Aircraft Company	1965
W. Duncan Rannie (died 1988)	California Institute of Technology	1979
Arthur E. Raymond (died 1999)	McDonnell Douglas	1964
Joseph B. Reagan (died 2011)	Lockheed Martin	1998
William H. Reardon	Naval Air Systems Command	2026
Eberhardt Rechtin (died 2006)	The Aerospace Corporation	1968
Eberhard F. M. Rees (died 1998)	NASA George C. Marshall Space Flight Center	1973
Emery I. Reeves (died 2026)	No affiliation	2003
Eli Reshotko (died 2025)	Case Western Reserve University	1984
Frank D. Robinson (died 2022)	Robinson Helicopter Company	2011
Alton D. Romig Jr.	National Academy of Engineering	2003
Robert K. Roney (died 2017)	Hughes Aircraft Company	1990
Jeanne M. Rosario	General Electric Aviation	2021
Harold A. Rosen (died 2017)	Independent consultant	1973
Kenneth M. Rosen	General Aero-Science Consultants, LLC	1997
Anatol Roshko (died 2017)	California Institute of Technology	1978
Martine Rothblatt	United Therapeutics	2026
Nicholas Rott (died 2006)	Stanford University	1993
Brian H. Rowe (died 2007)	GE Aircraft Engines	1983
Mary M. Roybal	Raytheon	2025
Paul E. Rubbert (died 2020)	Boeing Commercial Airplanes	1993
Robert W. Rummel (died 2009)	Independent consultant	1973
Elbert L. Rutan	Scaled Composites, LLC	1989
Robert L. Sackheim (died 2013)	Independent consultant	2000
Alejandro Miguel San Martin	NASA Jet Propulsion Laboratory, Caltech	2019
William S. Saric (died 2025)	Texas A&M University-College Station	2006
George S. Schairer (died 2004)	The Boeing Company	1967
Hanspeter Schaub	University of Colorado Boulder	2025
Daniel Jay Scheeres	University of Colorado Boulder	2017
Richard C. Scherrer (died 2018)	No affiliation	2010
John C. Schilling	General Electric Aviation	2013
Wolfgang Schmidt (died 2007)	Independent consultant	2001
Lucien A. Schmit Jr. (died 2018)	University of California, Los Angeles	1985
Bernard A. Schriever (died 2005)	Independent consultant	1967
Harris M. Schurmeier (died 2013)	NASA Jet Propulsion Laboratory, Caltech	1983
Bob Ewald Schutz (died 2015)	The University of Texas at Austin	2014
Robert C. Seamans Jr. (died 2008)	Massachusetts Institute of Technology	1968
William R. Sears (died 2002)	University of Arizona	1968
A. Richard Seebass (died 2000)	University of Colorado Boulder	1985
Patrick M. Shanahan	Spirit AeroSystems, Inc.	2019
Maurice E. Shank (died 2012)	Pratt and Whitney of China, Inc.	1983
Joseph F. Shea (died 1999)	Raytheon Company	1971
Joseph Emmett Shepherd	California Institute of Technology	2026
Gwynne E. Shotwell	SpaceX	2020
Heidi Shyu	Heidi Shyu Inc.	2019
Wanda A. Sigur	Lockheed Martin	2019
Abe Silverstein (died 2001)	NASA Lewis Research Center	1967
Josef Singer (died 2009)	Technion-Israel Institute of Technology	1981
Michael K. Sinnett	Boeing Commercial Airplanes	2016
Sigurd A. Sjoberg (died 2000)	NASA Johnson Space Center	1974
Robert E. Skelton (died 2023)	University of California, San Diego	2012
Ronald Smelt (died 2005)	Lockheed Corporation	1971
A.M.O. Smith (died 1997)	Independent consultant	1989
Colin Smith	Rolls-Royce, plc.	2017
Helmut E. Sobieczky	German Aerospace Research Establishment	1991
George E. Solomon (died 2005)	TRW Inc.	1967
Sreedhara Panicker Somanath	ISRO, Department of Space	2025
Zoltan Sandor Spakovszky	Massachusetts Institute of Technology	2026
Philippe Roland Spalart	Boeing Commercial Airplanes	2017
Jason L. Speyer	University of California, Los Angeles	2005
George S. Springer (died 2024)	Stanford University	1994
Thomas P. Stafford (died 2024)	Independent consultant	2014
John E. Steiner (died 2003)	Independent consultant	1978
Adam D. Steltzner	NASA Jet Propulsion Laboratory, Caltech	2016
H. Guyford Stever (died 2010)	No affiliation	1965
Grant H. Stokes	MIT Lincoln Laboratory	2016
Derald A. Stuart (died 2010)	Lockheed Martin	1983
Yu-Pen Su	National Chung-Shan Institute of Science and Technology	2024
Ronald D. Sugar	University of Southern California	2004
Raman I. Sujith	Indian Institute of Technology System	2023
Martin Summerfield (died 1996)	Princeton Combustion Research Laboratory, Inc.	1979
Verner E. Suomi (died 1995)	University of Wisconsin-Madison	1966
Byrana Nagappa Suresh	Indian Space Research Organization (ISRO)	2022
Joseph F. Sutter (died 2016)	Boeing Commercial Airplanes	1984
George W. Sutton (died 2021)	SPARTA	1994
Peter Swerling (died 2000)	Swerling, Manasse & Smith, Inc.	1978
Clarence A. Syvertson (died 2010)	NASA Ames Research Center	1981
Victor Szebehely (died 1997)	The University of Texas at Austin	1982
Itiro Tani (died 1990)	The University of Tokyo	1979
Byron D. Tapley	The University of Texas at Austin	1987
Thomas E. Taylor	Northrop Grumman	2025
Peter B. Teets (died 2020)	Lockheed Martin	1999
Daniel M. Tellep (died 2020)	Lockheed Martin	1979
David W. Thompson	Orbital ATK, Inc.	2002
Charles F. Tiffany (died 2014)	The Boeing Company	1984
Alan M. Title (died 2026)	Lockheed Martin Space Technology Advanced R&D Labs	2003
Hansel E. Tookes	Raytheon Aircraft Company	2023
John W. Townsend Jr. (died 2011)	NASA Goddard Space Flight Center	1975
John J. Tracy	The Boeing Company	2013
Charles E. Treanor (died 2012)	Independent consultant	1990
Richard H. Truly (died 2024)	National Renewable Energy Laboratory	2000
Stephen Wei-Lun Tsai	Stanford University	1995
Robert C. Turnbull	T.K. Engineering Associates, Inc.	1995
David Michael Van Wie	Johns Hopkins University Applied Physics Laboratory	2017
John Charles Vassberg	JetZero	2025
Francis L. VerSnyder (died 1989)	United Technologies Corporation	1981
Walter K. Victor (died 2012)	Technical Arts Associates	1990
Walter G. Vincenti (died 2019)	Stanford University	1987
Hans J. P. von Ohain (died 1998)	University of Dayton	1980
Irv Waaland (died 2022)	Northrop Corporation	1991
Ian A. Waitz	Massachusetts Institute of Technology	2014
Steven H. Walker	Lockheed Martin	2020
John D. Warner (died 2021)	The Boeing Company	1995
Michael M. Watkins	California Institute of Technology	2022
Daniel Weihs	Technion-Israel Institute of Technology	1996
Steven D. Weiner	Lockheed Martin	2024
Jasper A. Welch, Jr.	Science Applications International Corporation	1980
William Arthur Welsh	Lockheed Martin	2026
Robert H. Wertheim (died 2020)	Independent consultant	1977
Elmer P. Wheaton (died 1997)	Lockheed Martin	1967
Albert D. Wheelon (died 2013)	Hughes Aircraft Company	1970
David A. Whelan	University of California, San Diego	2007
Richard T. Whitcomb (died 2009)	NASA Langley Research Center	1976
Frank Whittle (died 1996)	U.S. Department of the Navy	1979
Robert H. Widmer (died 2011)	General Dynamics	1977
Sheila E. Widnall	Massachusetts Institute of Technology	1985
Peter G. Wilhelm (died 2025)	U.S. Naval Research Laboratory	1997
Karen E. Willcox	The University of Texas at Austin	2022
Forman A. Williams	University of California, San Diego	1988
Max L. Williams, Jr (died 2013)	The University of Texas at Austin	2003
Sam B. Williams (died 2009)	Williams International Corporation	1986
Thornton A. Wilson (died 1999)	The Boeing Company	1974
Kevin A. Wise	The Boeing Company	2018
Holden W. Withington (died 2011)	Boeing Commercial Airplanes	1980
Edward Woll (died 2010)	GE Aircraft Engines	1977
Carlos C. Wood (died 1997)	United Technologies Corporation	1967
Vanessa E. Wyche	NASA Johnson Space Center	2023
Israel J. Wygnanski	University of Arizona	1989
Henry T. Y. Yang	University of California, Santa Barbara	1991
Vigor Yang	Georgia Institute of Technology	2015
John F. Yardley (died 2001)	The Boeing Company	1977
Michael I. Yarymovych	Sarasota Space Associates	2016
A. Thomas Young	Lockheed Martin	1992
Laurence R. Young (died 2021)	Massachusetts Institute of Technology	1980
Abe M. Zarem (died 2023)	Frontier Associates	1987
Ben T. Zinn	Georgia Institute of Technology	1995
