= Nordt =

Nordt is a surname. Notable people with the surname include:

- Alison Nordt, American aerospace engineer
- Kristina Nordt (born 1982), German politician
