= Kathleen Howell =

American scientist and aerospace engineer

Kathleen Connor Howell
- Education: Iowa State University (BS); Stanford University (MS, Ph.D.)
- Awards: Fellow, National Academy of Engineering (2017); Dirk Brouwer Award (2004) '50 Most Important Women in Science' by Discover Magazine (2002); Presidential Young Investigator Award (1984)
- Scientific career
- Fields: Aerospace engineering, Orbital mechanics
- Workplaces: Purdue University
- Thesis: Three-dimensional, periodic halo orbits in the restricted three-body problem (1983)
- Doctoral advisor: John V. Breakwell
- Website: engineering.purdue.edu/AAE/people/ptProfile?resource_id=1384

Kathleen Connor Howell is an American aerospace engineer known for her contributions to dynamical systems theory applied to spacecraft trajectory design which led to the use of halo orbit in multiple NASA space missions. She is currently the Hsu Lo Distinguished Professor at Purdue University in the School of Aeronautics and Astronautics. In acknowledgment of her many achievements, Discover magazine recognized her in 2002 as one of the 50 most important women in science.

== Education ==
She obtained her Bachelor of Science degree in Aerospace Engineering at Iowa State University in 1973. Howell then received her MS and PhD degrees from Stanford University in 1977 and 1983, respectively. Her PhD advisor was John Breakwell and her PhD dissertation was entitled "Three-dimensional, periodic halo orbits in the restricted three-body problem".

== Career ==
Howell started as an assistant professor at Purdue University School of Aeronautics and Astronautics in 1982 and is the School's first female tenured professor. She is best known for her contributions to the three-body problem, the interplanetary superhighway, and artificial satellite theories.

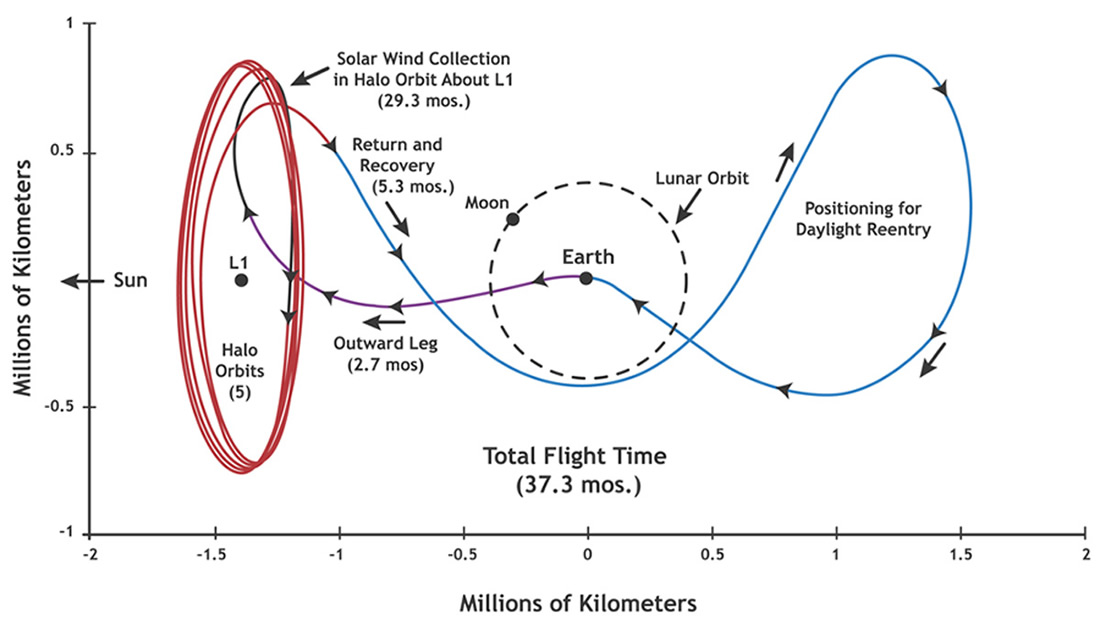
The Genesis mission's trajectory and flight plan which includes 5 halo loops based on Howell's work

Howell's work on computing the characteristics of the invariant manifolds associated with halo orbits was first applied for design of trajectory for Genesis mission and enabling low-energy sample return from Sun-Earth L1 point. The spacecraft trajectory for Genesis exploiting Howell's manifold method was computed by Howell and her student Brian Barden during a weekend in August 1996 after an urgent request from Jet Propulsion Lab scientist Martin Lo.

Howell is currently the Editor-In-Chief Emeritus of the AAS Journal of the Astronautical Sciences; she is also a member of other editorial boards. She is both an AIAA and an AAS Fellow.

== Awards and honors ==
Howell is a 1984 winner of the 1984 Presidential Young Investigator Award, presented to her at the White House by Ronald Reagan, and the 2004 recipient of the Dirk Brouwer Award from the American Astronautical Society. In 2007, she delivered the Breakwell Memorial Lecture at the Astrodynamics Symposium at the International Astronautical Congress in Hyderabad, India.

In 2017 Kathleen Howell was elected to National Academy of Engineering with a citation "For contributions in dynamical systems theory and invariant manifolds culminating in optimal interplanetary trajectories and the Interplanetary Superhighway".

In 2024, the International Astronomical Union's Working Group on Small Bodies Nomenclature gave the name Kathleenhowell to a large asteroid in the asteroid belt of the Solar System. The entry honors Howell as “instrumental in advancing dynamical systems theory and invariant manifolds, culminating in trajectory optimization. Her pioneering work on the three-body problem has led to the use of halo orbits in several missions.”

== Papers ==
- "Three-Dimensional, Periodic, 'Halo' Orbits"
