= Paul Blasingame =

American engineer (1919–2015)

Benjamin Paul Blasingame
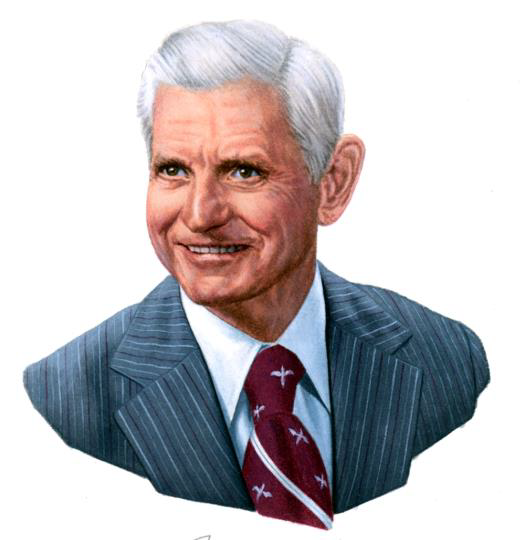
- Born: 1 August 1919; State College, Pennsylvania, U.S.
- Died: 13 November 2015 (aged 97); Kalispell, Montana, U.S.
- Burial place: Arlington National Cemetery
- Spouses: Ella Mae Perry (m. 1942; died 1991); Margaret A. Timmons (died 2015)
- Children: 4
- Military career
- Allegiance: United States
- Branch: United States Army (1941–1947); United States Air Force (1947–1959)
- Service years: 1941–1959
- Rank: Colonel
- Awards: Legion of Merit; NASA Public Service Award (1969); NASA Public Service Group Achievement Award (1969); NASA Distinguished Public Service Medal (1973)
- Other work: Delco Electronics division of General Motors

Benjamin Paul Blasingame (1 August 1919 – 13 November 2015) was a United States Air Force (USAF) officer and engineer who played an important role in the development of the Intercontinental Ballistic Missile (ICBM) and inertial navigation systems.

A 1940 graduate of Pennsylvania State College, he served with the United States Army Signal Corps during World War II. After the war he transferred to the USAF and earned a Doctor of Science degree at the Massachusetts Institute of Technology's Instrumentation Laboratory in 1950. In 1954 he was selected by Colonel Bernard A. Schriever to join the Western Development Division, which oversaw its development of the Atlas ICBM. As the Chief Guidance and Control Project Officer, Blasingame advocated the use of inertial navigation systems in ICBMs, He was the manager of the HGM-25A Titan I ICBM project from 1956 to 1958, and the first head of the department of astronautics at the United States Air Force Academy from 1958 to 1959.

In 1959 Blasingame, resigned his commission and joined the AC Spark Plug division of General Motors, which later became Delco Electronics. He helped develop the inertial navigation system for the Titan II ICBM, which became the Delco Carousel navigation system, and also found use in the Boeing 747, C-5A Galaxy, C-141 Starlifter and KC-135 tanker. AC Sparkplug built the navigation systems used by the Apollo spacecraft and the Lunar Roving Vehicle that saw service on the Apollo 15, Apollo 16 and Apollo 17 missions.

== Early life ==
Benjamin Paul Blasingame was born in State College, Pennsylvania, on 1 August 1919. He graduated from Pennsylvania State College in 1940, having majored in mechanical engineering. He also participated in the college's Army Reserve Officers' Training Corps program. In early 1941 he was called to active duty. He received a regular commission in the United States Army Signal Corps in January 1942. During World War II he worked on ground-based radar systems with an Air Force Fighter Group in Panama as a communications and radar officer. In 1945 he joined the Armament Laboratory at Wright Field, Ohio.

== US Air Force ==
Blasingame remained in the Army after the war, working in engineering positions, and he joined the United States Air Force (USAF) on its formation in September 1947. That year the USAF sponsored his enrolment in a graduate program at the Instrumentation Laboratory at the Massachusetts Institute of Technology (MIT), where he earned his Doctor of Science degree in 1950, writing his doctoral thesis on "Optimum parameters for automatic airborne navigation" under the supervision of Charles Stark Draper. He became known as a member of Draper's "inertial mafia", who advocated the use of inertial navigation systems.

After graduation, Blasingame served at the Pentagon in Washington, DC, where he was involved in the development of the turbofan engine. Colonel Bernard A. Schriever, recruited him to work in the recently formed Office of Development Planning, where he developed specifications for a new Strategic Air Command (SAC) bomber, in which he paid particular attention to considerations of ensuring the security and safety of the crews.

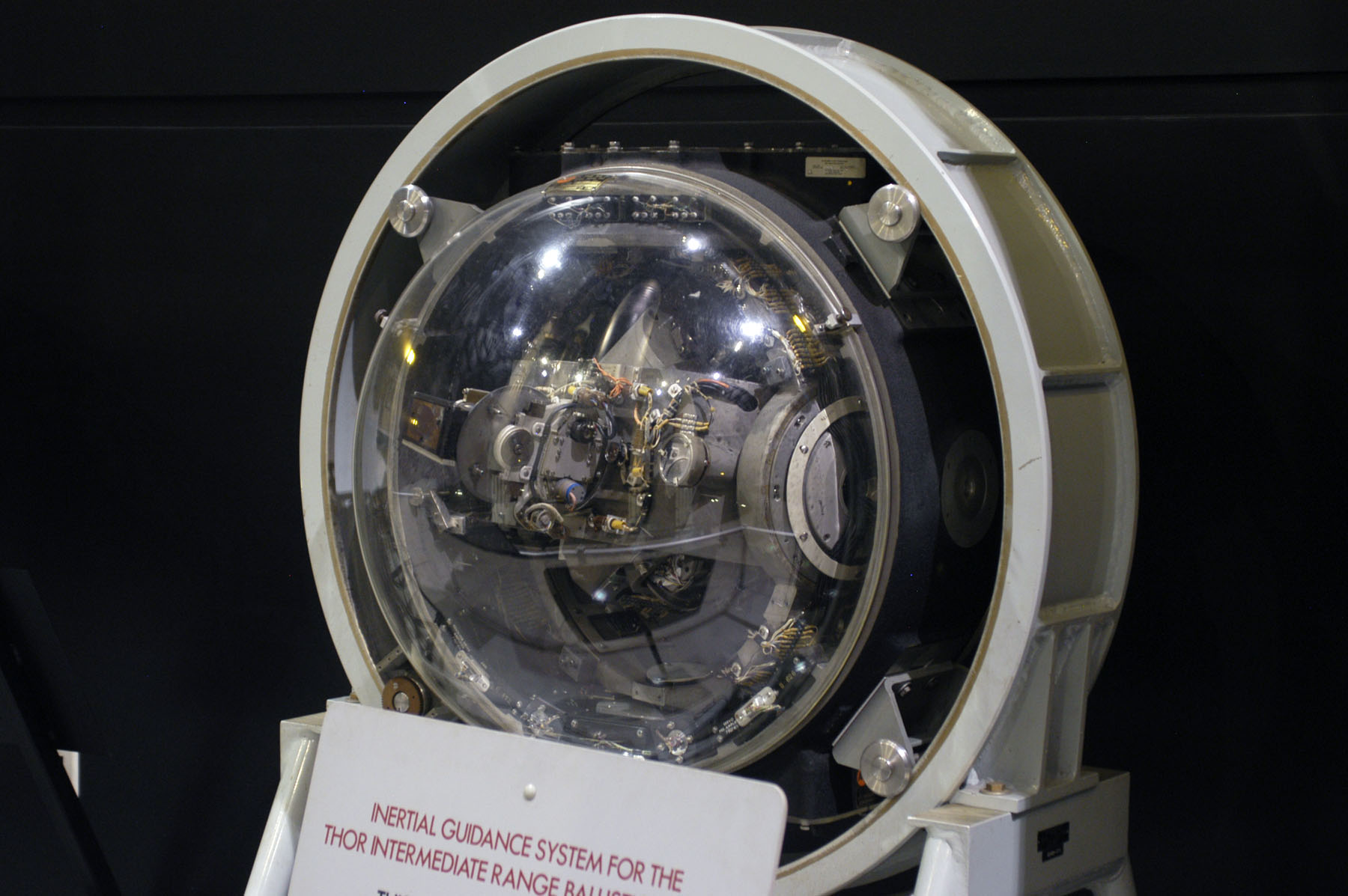
Inertial Guidance System for Thor missile exhibit in the Missile and Space Gallery at the National Museum of the United States Air Force.

In May 1954, on the recommendation of the "Teapot" Committee chaired by John von Neumann, the USAF accorded top priority to Atlas, the project to create an Intercontinental Ballistic Missile (ICBM), and Schriever was appointed to command the Western Development Division, which oversaw its development. Schriever was authorized to pick key members of his staff, and Blasingame was one of his original four choices. (Note: The other three were: Lieutenant Colonel Beryl L. Boatman, Lieutenant Colonel Otto Glasser and Major Paul L. Mare.) He became the project's Chief Guidance and Control Project Officer. In this role, Blasingame advocated the use of inertial navigation systems in ICBMs, The proponents of inertial navigation systems argued that it was less vulnerable than radio navigation systems with their ground stations, but at the time were outnumbered by those of radio navigation systems, who argued that inertial systems were too heavy and too inaccurate for use on ICBMs.

After consulting with Draper, Blasingame concluded that MIT and the AC Spark Plug division of General Motors could create a workable inertial navigation system for an ICBM, and a contract was awarded for an inertial system as a backup for radio guidance on the Atlas and the Thor missiles. This was achieved, and inertial navigation systems subsequently became primary guidance system for Atlas and Thor, and the sole navigation system on later generations of ICBMs. From 1956 to 1958, Blasingame, now a colonel, was the manager of the HGM-25A Titan I ICBM project.

Blasingame's next assignment was as head of the newly created department of astronautics at the United States Air Force Academy. In 1964 he published a textbook in the subject, simply titled "Astronautics". He told Clayton Knowles, a report for The New York Times that his aim was to "turn out future commanders of ballistic missiles squadrons — not space cadets... These boys are more likely to be serving in ballistic missile squadrons than in conventional air squadrons in the age ahead."

For his services, Blasingame was awarded the Legion of Merit.

== Delco ==
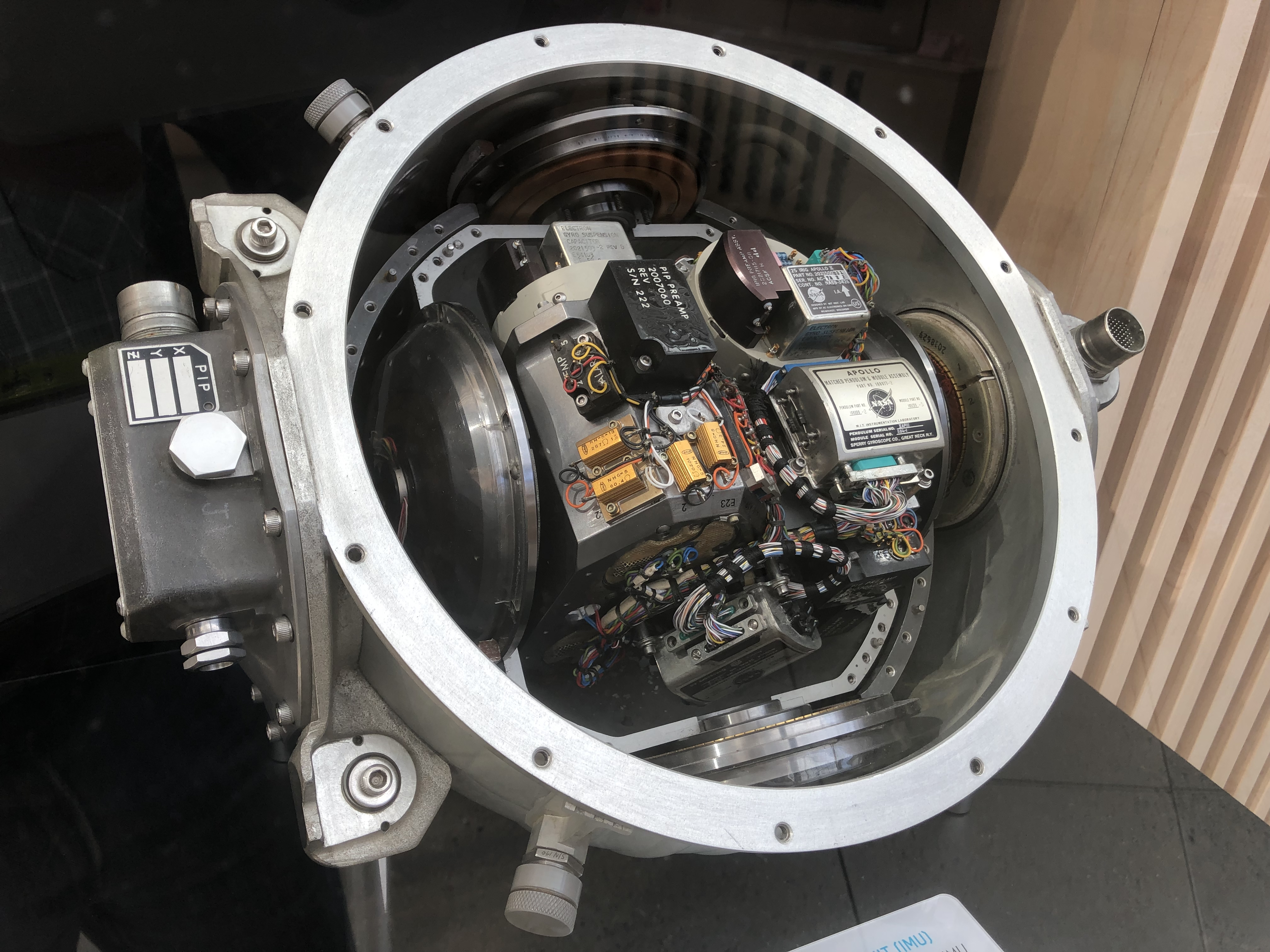
Apollo spacecraft Inertial Measurement Unit

Blasingame resigned his commission in the USAF in 1959, and took a job at AC Spark Plug in Milwaukee, Wisconsin, where he became the director of engineering, and later the manager. AC Spark Plug was awarded the USAF contract for the development of the inertial navigation system for the Titan II ICBM in April 1959. This made the Titan II the first ICBM to be wholly dependent on inertial navigation systems. Blasingame contributed to the development of its inertial navigation system, which became the Delco Carousel, and also found civilian use in the Boeing 747, and USAF use in the C-5A Galaxy, the C-141 Starlifter and the KC-135 tanker. Carousel has since been integrated with Global Positioning System capabilities to provide precise and reliable navigation.

AC Sparkplug built the navigation systems used by the Apollo spacecraft and the Lunar Roving Vehicle that saw service on the Apollo 15, Apollo 16 and Apollo 17 missions. Before the Apollo 8 mission became the first spacecraft to travel to the Moon, Blasingame was a member of the Apollo executive committee that was consulted about whether a lunar orbit could be achieved. He told the committee that the guidance and navigation systems were ready. For his services, he was awarded the NASA Public Service Award and NASA Public Service Group Achievement Award in 1969 and the NASA Distinguished Public Service Medal in 1973.

AC Spark Plug merged with United Delco in 1971, and became Delco Electronics in 1974. He moved to Santa Barbara, California, where he managed its operations, and worked on the development of helicopters.

== Later life ==
After retiring from Delco in 1979, Blasingame continued to serve on National Research Council committees that advised NASA on the development of helicopter technology. He was also a board member of Cottage Hospital, a trustee of the Santa Barbara Foundation, and the chairman of the Santa Barbara Chapter of the National Alliance of Business. He married Ella Mae Perry in 1942; they had four children. She died in 1991, and he later married Margaret A. Timmons, who died in 2015. He then moved to Kalispell, Montana, to be with his family, and he died there on 13 November 2015. He was buried at Arlington National Cemetery. His papers are in the University Archives at Virginia Tech.

== Bibliography ==
- Blasingame, B. P. (1 January 1964). Astronautics. McGraw-Hill Series in Missile and Space Technology. McGraw-Hill. OCLC 499719053.
