= Hanspeter Schaub =

Swiss aerospace engineer

Hanspeter Schaub is a Swiss aerospace engineer.

Schaub was raised in Switzerland, and became a fan of science fiction films such as the Star Wars franchise, which led to his interest in aerospace engineering. Upon completing a year of high school in the United States as an exchange student, Schaub attended Texas A&M University, where he earned bachelor's, master's, and doctoral degree in aerospace engineering. He holds the Schaden Leadership Chair and the Glenn Murphy Endowed Chair at the University of Colorado Boulder College of Engineering and Applied Science. Schaub was appointed chief editor of the American Institute of Aeronautics and Astronautics' Journal of Spacecraft and Rockets in 2017, and was replaced by Olivier de Weck.

Schaub was elected a 2013 fellow of the American Astronautical Society, and awarded an equivalent honor by the American Institute of Aeronautics and Astronautics in 2019. Schaub is the 2021 recipient of the AIAA's J. Leland Atwood Award. In 2025, Schaub was elected to the National Academy of Engineering.
