= Alon Gany =

Aerospace Engineering professor

- אלון גני
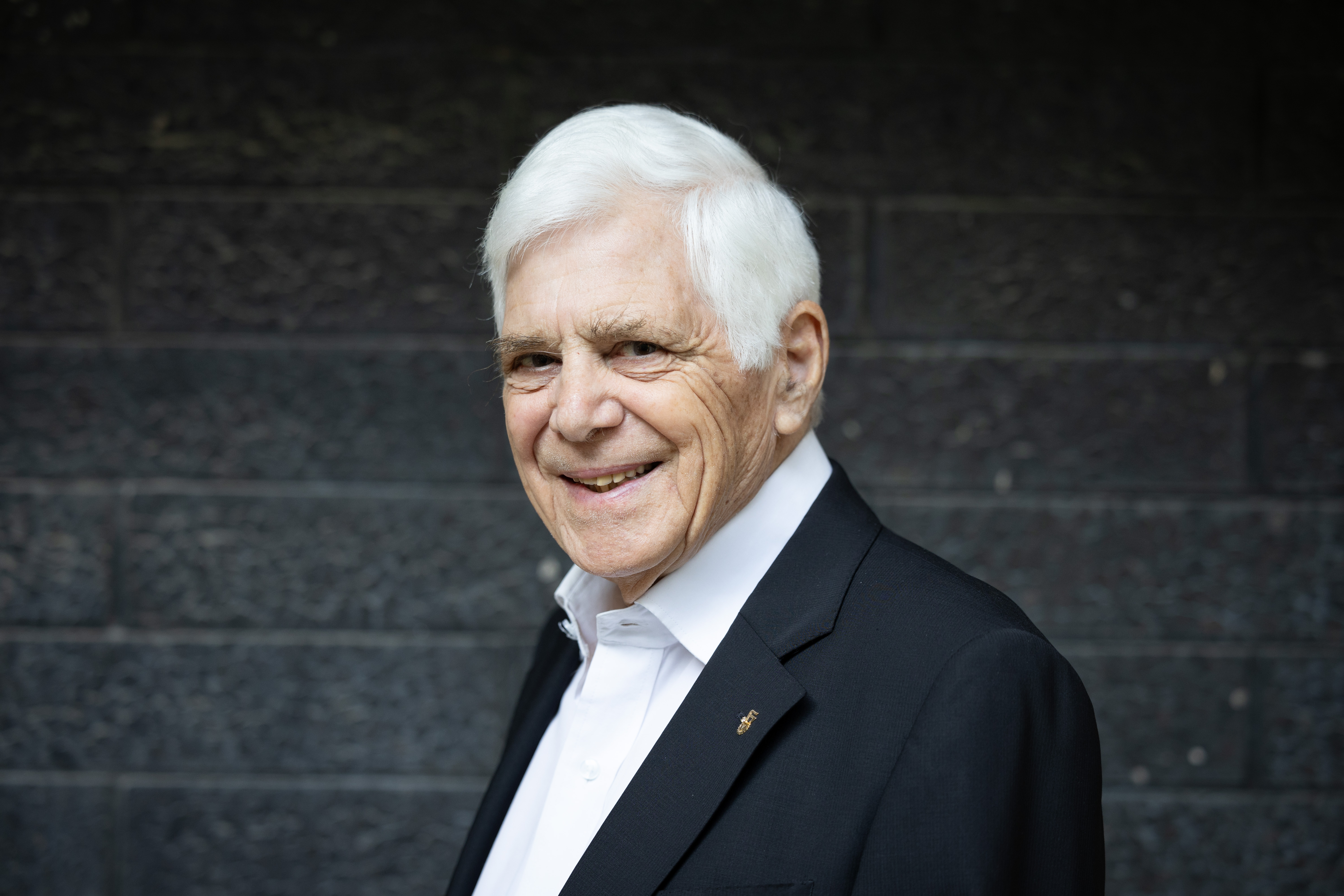
- Born: February 1944 (age 82); Tel-Aviv
- Education: Technion
- Known for: Propulsion
- Awards: US National Academy of Engineering, Israel Academy of Sciences and Humanities, fellow of the American Institute of Aeronautics and Astronautics
- Scientific career
- Fields: Aerospace Engineering
- Workplaces: Technion, Princeton University

Alon Gany (Hebrew: אלון גני; born: February 1944) is an Israeli academic. He is a professor emeritus at the Technion – Israel Institute of Technology, in the Stephen B. Klein Faculty of Aerospace Engineering, where he held the Lena and Ben Fohrman Chair in Aeronautical Engineering.

Gany is an international member of the US National Academy of Engineering (NAE) and the International Academy of Astronautics (IAA). He is also a member of the Israel Academy of Sciences and Humanities and a fellow of the American Institute of Aeronautics and Astronautics (AIAA).

== Early life and education ==
Alon Gany was born in 1944 in Tel Aviv. He studied at Dvir High School in Kiryat Ata. His military service was in the Nahal. He later served in a paratrooper brigade as a reservist.

Gany received a B.Sc. in chemical engineering from the Technion in 1968, followed by an M.Sc. in aerospace engineering in 1971 and a Ph.D. in the same field in 1975.

His thesis, "Theoretical Investigation of a Hybrid Rocket Motor Employing Liquid Oxidizer," was supervised by Professors Yaakov M. Timnat and Micha Wolfshtein.

== Academic career ==
Gany was a postdoctoral research fellow at Martin Summerfield’s propulsion and combustion laboratory (later headed by William Sirignano) in the Department of Mechanical and Aerospace Engineering at Princeton University.

After joining the Technion faculty in 1979, Gany was promoted to associate professor in 1990 and full professor in 1996.

During his career, he headed the Propulsion and Combustion Laboratory, was an advisor for the planning and construction and then the director of the Fine Rocket Center and directed the Sylvia and David Fine Rocket Propulsion Center and the Aerothermodynamics Laboratory, served as Dean of Students, and held the Lena and Ben Fohrman Chair in Aeronautical Engineering. He became Professor Emeritus in 2012.

He was a visiting Associate Professor at Princeton University and spent a sabbatical at the Naval Postgraduate School in Monterey, California as a Senior National Research Council (NRC) Fellow.

Gany is an Associate Editor of the International Journal of Energetic Materials and Chemical Propulsion (IJEMCP), and a member of the Editorial Board of Combustion, Explosion, and Shock Waves, and of the Journal of Marine Science and Engineering (JMSE). He is also a Consulting Editor of FirePhysChem Journal.

== Research ==
Gany's research has focused on aerospace propulsion, energetic materials, and combustion, with particular emphasis on rocket propulsion (hybrid rockets and solid rockets), ramjets, and scramjets. His work has also been extended to marine propulsion systems, including water-breathing underwater ramjets, as well as hydrogen production and energy conversion technologies such as fuel cells.

Gany also made contributions to the development of both air-breathing and underwater ramjet systems, including marine derivatives adapted for naval applications.

== Selected publications ==
- Gany, A. and Caveny, L.H., "Agglomeration and Ignition Mechanism of Aluminum Particles in Solid Propellants", Proceedings of the17th Symposium (International) on Combustion, The Combustion Institute, August 1978, pp. 1453-1461. https://doi.org/10.1016/S0082-0784%2879%2980137-X
- Pang, W-Q., Yetter, R.A., DeLuca, L.T., Fan, X-Z., Zarko, V., Gany, A., Zhang, X-H., “Boron-Based Composite Energetic Materials (B-CEMs): Preparation, Characterization and Applications”, Progress in Energy and Combustion Science, Vol. 93, 2022, 101038. https://doi.org/10.1016/j.pecs.2022.101038
- Netzer, A. and Gany, A., "Burning and Flameholding Characteristics of a Miniature Solid Fuel Ramjet Combustor", J. of Propulsion and Power, Vol. 7, No. 3, May-June 1991, pp. 357-363. https://doi.org/10.2514/3.2333
- Ben-Yakar, A., Natan, B. and Gany, A., "Investigation of a Solid Fuel Scramjet Combustor", J. of Propulsion and Power, Vol. 14, No. 4, July-August 1998, pp. 447-455. https://doi.org/10.2514/2.5321
- Elitzur, S., Rosenband, V., and Gany, A., “Study of Hydrogen Production and Storage Based on Aluminum-Water Reaction”, International Journal of Hydrogen Energy, Vol. 39, 2014, pp. 6328-6334. doi:10.1016/j.ijhydene.2014.02.037
- Gany, A., “Innovative Concepts for High-Speed Underwater Propulsion”, International Journal of Energetic Materials and Chemical Propulsion (IJEMCP), Vol. 17, Issue 2, 2018, pp. 83-109. DOI:10.1615/IntJEnergeticMaterialsChemProp.2018027877.
- Dinisman, S., Eisen, N.E., and Gany, A., “Performance of Water-Augmented Metallized Hybrid Propellant Ram Rocket during Underwater Motion”, Journal of Propulsion and Power, Vol. 41, No. 5, 2025, pp. 542-549. DOI: 10.2514/1.B39699.
- Michaels, D. and Gany, A., “Modeling and Testing of a Tube-in-Tube Concept for Separation of Bodies in Space”, Acta Astronautica, Vol. 129, 2016, pp. 214-222. http://dx.doi.org/10.1016/j.actaastro.2016.09.013
- Zamir, I., Ben-Reuven, M., Gany, A., and Grinstein, D., "Investigation of Electrically Controlled Ammonium Nitrate – Epoxy Solid Propellant at High Pressures", Propellants, Explosives, Pyrotechnics, Vol. 46, 2021, pp. 477-483.DOI: 10.1002/prep.202000208
- Elanjickal, S. and Gany, A., “Enhancement of the Fuel Regression Rate in Hybrid Propulsion by Expandable Graphite Additive", Combustion Science and Technology, Vol. 192, No. 7, 2020, pp. 1253-1273. DOI: 10.1080/00102202.2020.1748017.
- Muller, G.T. and Gany, A., “Increasing Burning Rate and Motor Thrust by Expandable Graphite Additives”, Journal of Propulsion and Power, Vol. 39, No. 5, 2023, pp. 709-717. DOI: 10.2514/1.B39126

== Honors and awards ==
Gany is an international member of the US National Academy of Engineering (NAE) “For advances in the development of solid propellants for rockets and scramjets” and the International Academy of Astronautics (IAA). He is also a member of the Israel Academy of Sciences and Humanities and a fellow of the American Institute of Aeronautics and Astronautics (AIAA).

He is a Fellow of the Royal Institution of Naval Architects (RINA), Honorary Fellow of the High Energy Materials Society of India (HEMSI), and Honorary Fellow of the Australian Institute of High Energetic Materials (AIHEM). In 2025 he received the Head of MAFAT (the Israeli Directorate of Defense, Research, and Development) Lifetime Achievement Award "for his unique contribution to the field of rocket propulsion".

In the same year, he was also the recipient of the AIAA Wyld Propulsion Award “For pioneering contributions in propulsion research on metalized propellants, energetic materials, hybrid rockets, ramjets, and scramjets, with sustained excellence in educating generations of propulsion experts”.

Gany is also a Permanent Distinguished Lecturer at the Technion.
