= Journal of Spacecraft and Rockets =

- Discipline: aerospace engineering, rocketry, hypersonics, spaceflight
- Language: English
- Edited by: Olivier de Weck

Publication details
- History: 1964–present
- Publisher: American Institute of Aeronautics and Astronautics
- Frequency: Bi-monthly
- Impact factor: 1.808 (2021)

Standard abbreviations
- ISO 4: J. Spacecr. Rockets

Indexing
- ISSN: 0022-4650 (print); 1533-6794 (web)

Links
- Journal homepage

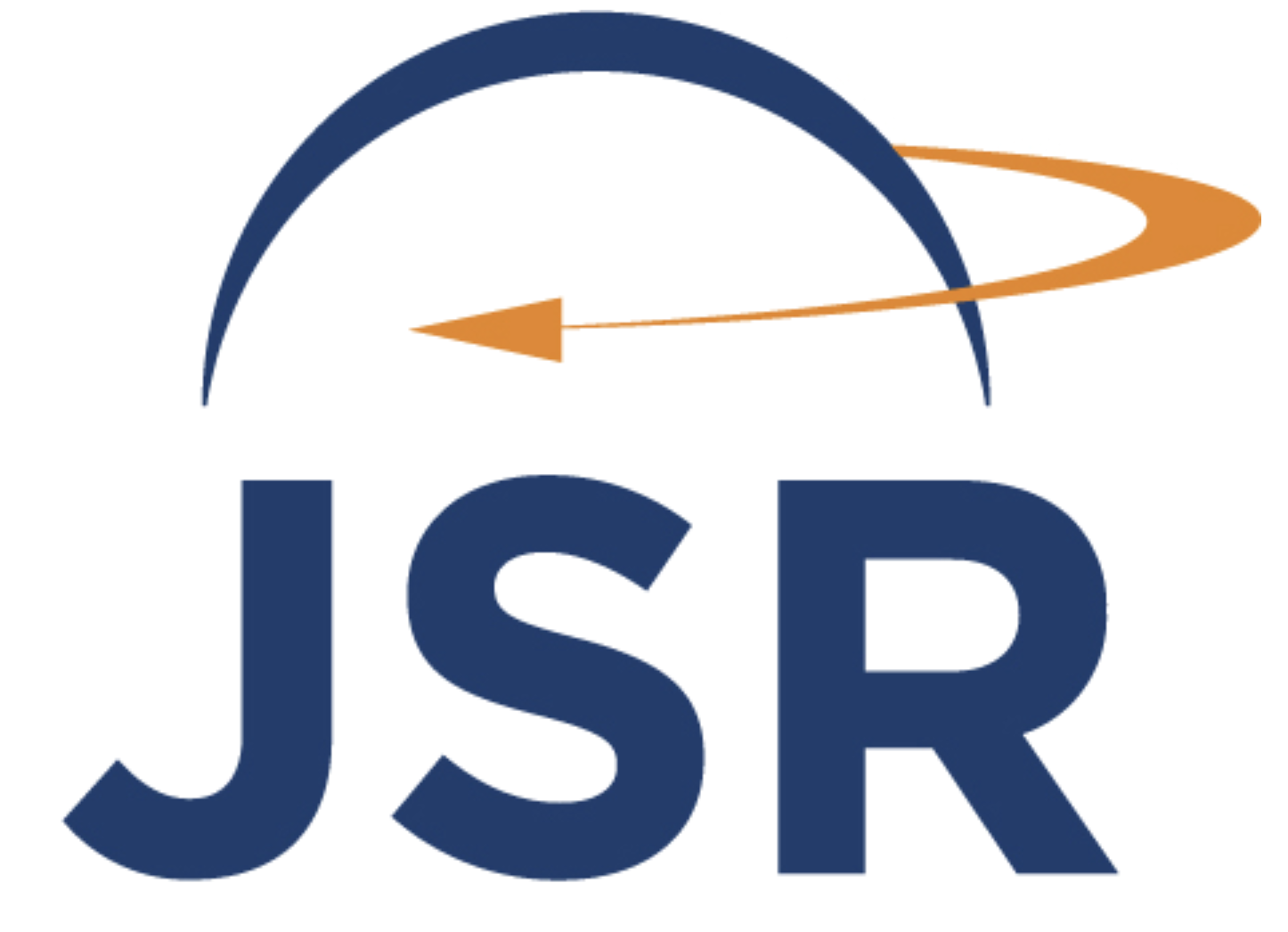

The Journal of Spacecraft and Rockets is a bi-monthly (six issues per year) peer-reviewed scientific journal published by the American Institute of Aeronautics and Astronautics. It covers the science and technology of spaceflight, satellite and mission design, missile design, and rockets. The editor-in-chief is Olivier de Weck (Massachusetts Institute of Technology). It was established in 1964.

== Abstracting and indexing ==
The journal is abstracted and indexed in:

- Current Contents/Engineering, Computing & Technology
- EBSCO databases
- Ei Compendex
- Inspec
- METADEX
- Science Citation Index
- Scopus
- zbMATH

According to the Journal Citation Reports, the journal has a 2021 impact factor of 1.808.

== History ==
The journal was published bimonthly from the beginning. Prior editors have been:

- Hanspeter Schaub (2017–2021)
- Robert D. Braun (2014–2016)
- E. Vincent Zoby (1993–2014)
- Clark H. Lewis (1990–1993)
- Frank J. Redd (1987–1989)
- R.H. Woodward Waesche (1981–1987)
- Paul F. Holloway (1978–1981)
- Donald C. Fraser (1975–1978)
- Ralph R. Ragan (1972–1975)
- Gordon L. Dugger (1964–1971) - founding editor
