= Otto Glasser =

United States Air Force general

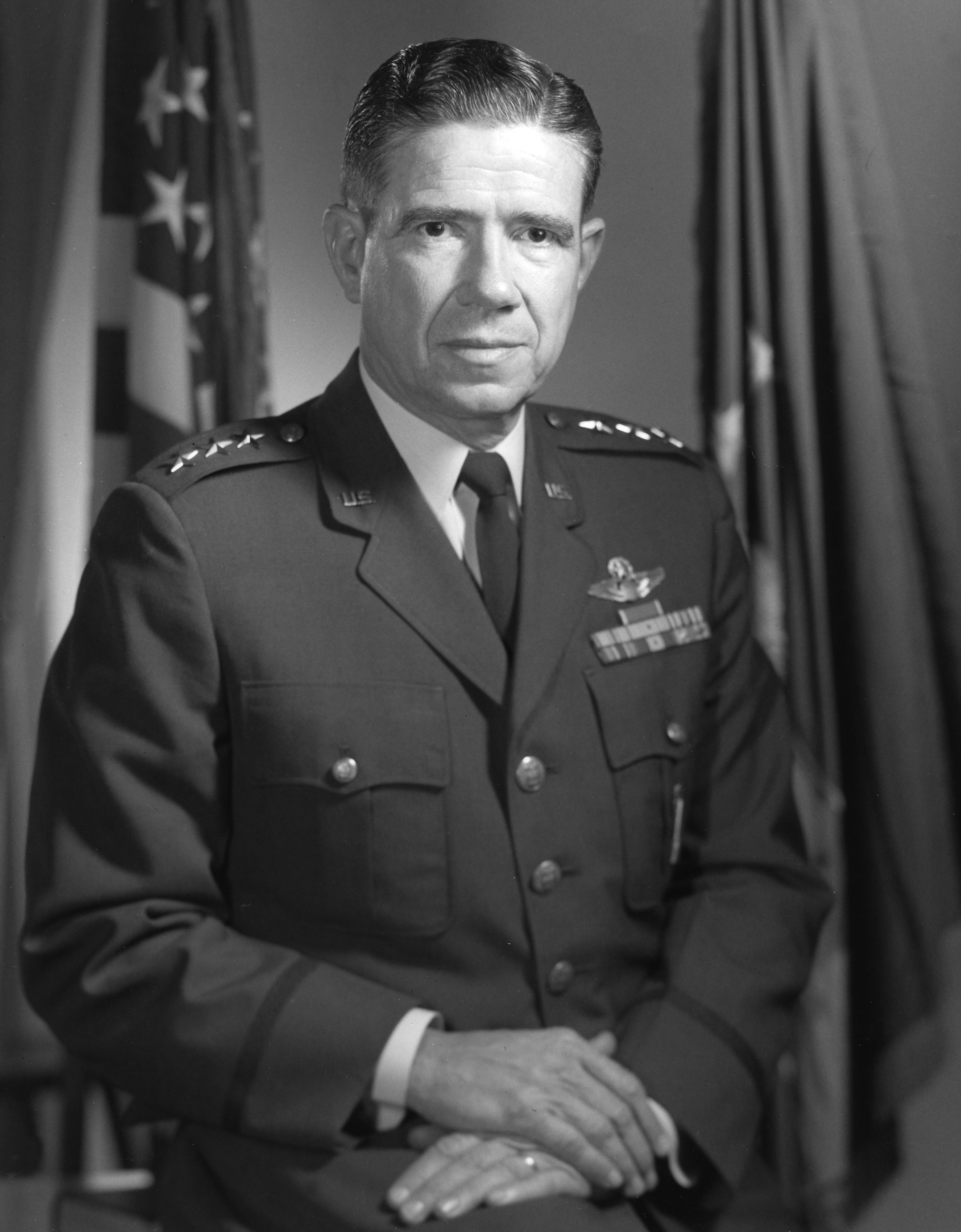
- Born: 2 October 1918; Wilkes-Barre, Pennsylvania, U.S.
- Died: 26 February 1996 (aged 77) Sarasota, Florida, U.S.
- Branch: United States Army (1941–1947); United States Air Force (1947–1973)
- Service years: 1941–1973
- Rank: Lieutenant general
- Commands: Air Force Ballistic Missile Division
- Conflicts: World War II
- Awards: Air Force Distinguished Service Medal; Legion of Merit; Air Force Commendation Medal

Otto John Glasser (2 October 1918 – 26 February 1996) was a lieutenant general in the United States Air Force and pioneering weapons scientist who played an important part in the development of the Atlas and Minuteman III intercontinental ballistic missiles.

== Early career and education ==
Otto John Glasser was born in Wilkes-Barre, Pennsylvania, on 2 October 1918, the son of Leo and Lillian Cave Glasser. He had two brothers, Leo and Robert, and two sisters, Ruth and Lois. He graduated from Cornell University with a bachelor's degree in engineering in May 1940, and was commissioned as a second Lieutenant in the Officers Reserve Corps.

== World War II ==
Glasser was called to active duty in February 1941, and served in the United States Army Signal Corps installing the then top secret, newly developed radar technology as an early attack warning system in the Caribbean during World War II. He married Norma Wilhelmina Mayo on 9 September 1943. That month he reported for flying training with the US Army Air Force as a bomber pilot and was awarded his Aviator badge (wings) in June 1944. He was then trained to fly the Boeing B-17 Flying Fortress, the Consolidated B-24 Liberator and the Boeing B-29 Superfortress. In September 1945 he became the chief of the Radar Branch at the headquarters of the Continental Air Forces, based at Bolling Field in Washington, D.C.

== Post-war ==
Glasser entered Ohio State University, where he earned a Master of Science degree in electronic physics in 1947. He was then assigned to the Armed Forces Special Weapons Project in Albuquerque, New Mexico. In January 1951 he entered the Air Command and Staff School at Maxwell Air Force Base in Alabama. On graduation in May he was assigned to United States Air Force Headquarters in Washington, D.C., as the chief of the Munitions Branch of the Research and Development Directorate.

In May 1954, on the recommendation of the "Teapot" Committee chaired by John von Neumann, the USAF accorded top priority to Atlas, the project to create an Intercontinental Ballistic Missile (ICBM), and Colonel Bernard Schriever was appointed to command the Western Development Division, which oversaw its development. Schriever was authorized to pick key members of his staff, and Glasser was one of his original four choices, known as the "Schoolhouse Gang", along with Lieutenant Colonel Beryl L. Boatman, Lieutenant Colonel Paul Blasingame and Major Paul L. Mare.

Glasser became the director of the Atlas program in February 1956. Test firings of Atlas missiles were expensive, so Glasser instituted a program of intensively testing its components and subsystems with the aim of minimizing the number of test flights that would be required. This had the advantage of permitting the use of sophisticated instrumentation that could not be used on a test flight. Although the first two test flights, on 11 June and 25 September 1957, were failures, the third, on 17 December, was successful, as were four of the next five test flights.

In October 1959, Glasser was assigned to the headquarters of the Air Research and Development Command (ARDC) at Andrews Air Force Base in Maryland as the chief of the Air Force Ballistic Missile Division, which had superseded the Western Development Division on 1 June 1957, and then as the assistant deputy chief of staff for research and engineering. In February 1961 he was designated the special assistant to the commander of the ARDC, with additional duty as chief of the ARDC Special Projects Office.

Glasser moved to L.G. Hanscom Field in Massachusetts in July 1962 as the vice commander of the Electronic Systems Division of the Air Force Systems Command. In July 1965, he was reassigned to Headquarters U.S. Air Force in the Office of the Deputy Chief of Staff for Research and Development as the deputy director of operational requirements and development plans, and later as the assistant deputy chief of staff for research and development.

In February 1970, Glasser became the Deputy Chief of Staff for Research and Development and Military Director of the USAF Scientific Advisory Board. As such, he was responsible for the development and testing of the Minuteman III missile.

Glasser retired from the Air Force on 1 August 1973, with the rank of lieutenant general.

== Later life ==
From 1973 to 1986, Glasser served with General Dynamics Corporation, where he rose to become its Vice President for Government Relations. He retired in 1986 to Sarasota, Florida, where he died on 26 February 1996. He is buried with his wife Norma Mayo Glasser in Arlington National Cemetery.
