= Rolls-Royce LiftSystem =

Aircraft propulsion system

LiftSystem
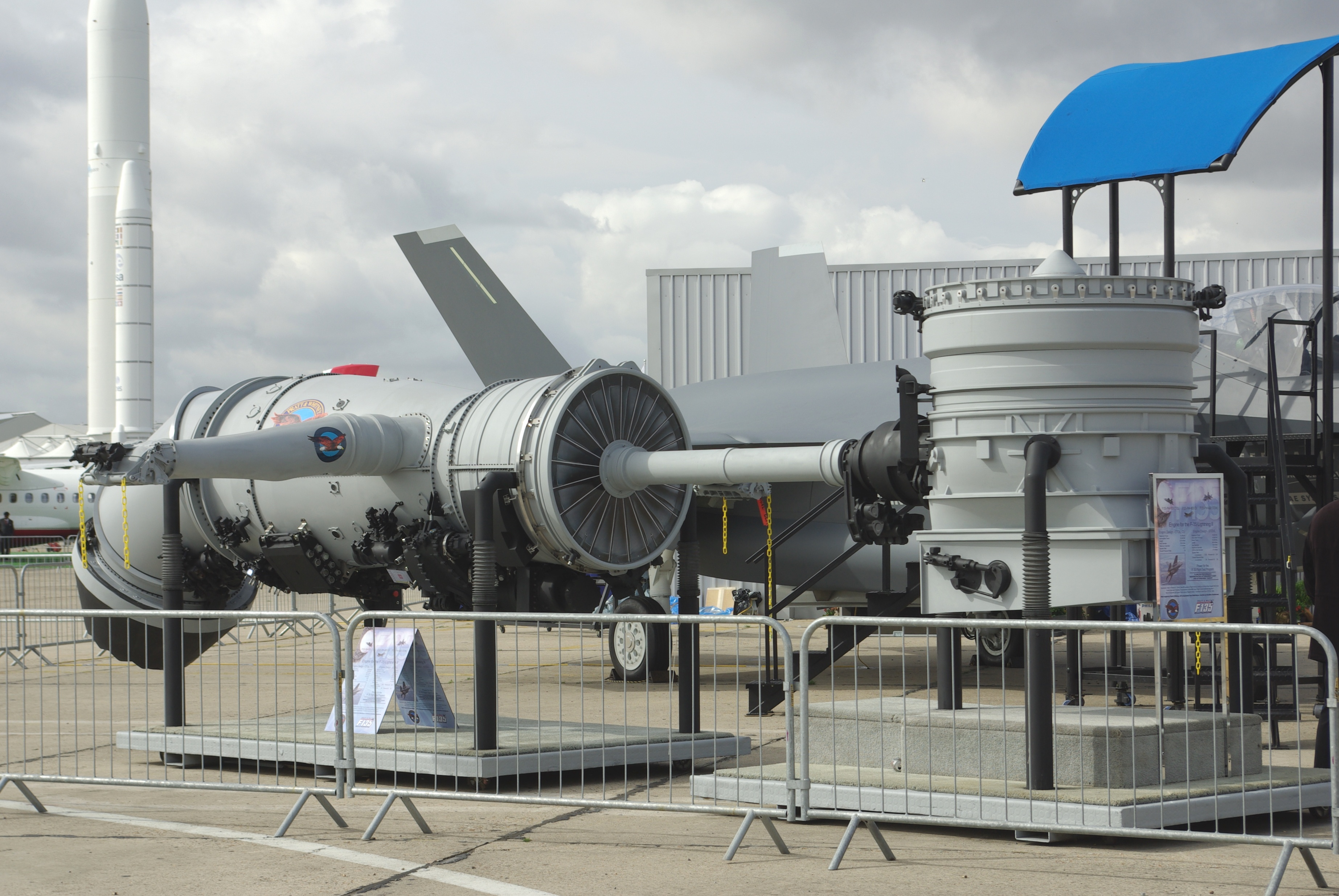
- The Rolls-Royce LiftSystem coupled to an F135 turbofan at the Paris Air Show in 2007
- Type: STOVL lift system
- Manufacturer: Rolls-Royce plc
- Major applications: F-35 Lightning II

The Rolls-Royce LiftSystem, together with the F135 engine, is an aircraft propulsion system designed for use in the STOVL variant of the F-35 Lightning II. The complete system, known as the Integrated Lift Fan Propulsion System (ILFPS), was awarded the Collier Trophy in 2001.

== Requirement ==
The F-35B STOVL variant of the Joint Strike Fighter (JSF) aircraft was intended to replace the McDonnell Douglas AV-8B Harrier II and the McDonnell Douglas F/A-18 Hornet used by the United States Marine Corps. It would also replace the British Aerospace Harrier II and the British Aerospace Sea Harrier used by Royal Air Force and Royal Navy. The aircraft had to have a supersonic capability, and a suitable vertical lift system that would not compromise this capability was needed for the STOVL variant. This requirement was met by the Rolls-Royce LiftSystem, developed through a $1.3 billion System Development and Demonstration (SDD) contract from Pratt & Whitney. This requirement was met on 20 July 2001.

== Design and development ==
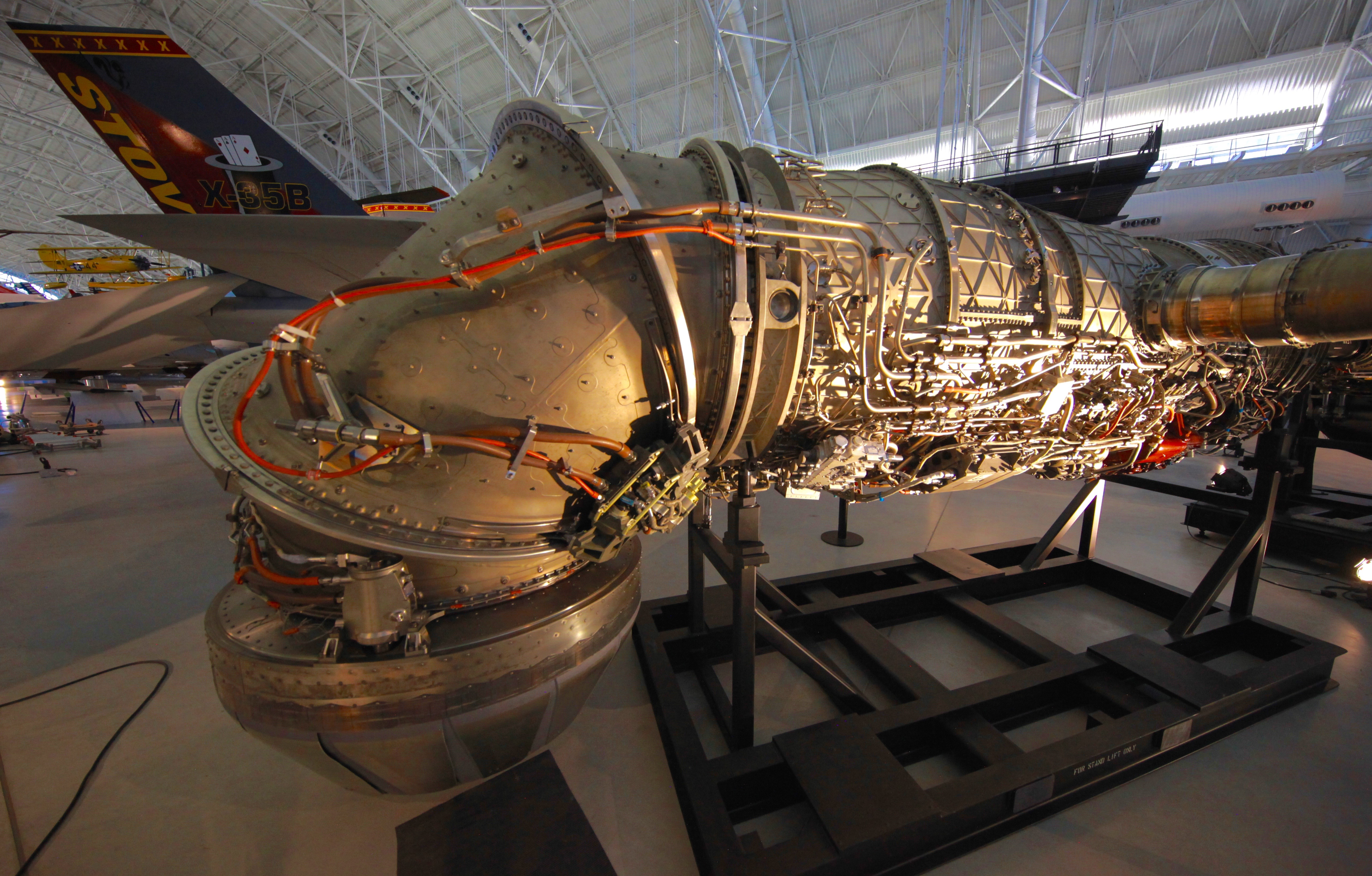
the rear of the F135 engine (nozzle rotated down) that powers the Rolls-Royce LiftSystem

Instead of using separate lift engines, like the Yakovlev Yak-38, or rotating nozzles for engine bypass air, like the Harrier, the "LiftSystem" has a shaft-driven LiftFan, designed by Lockheed Martin and developed by Rolls-Royce, and a thrust vectoring nozzle for the engine exhaust that provides lift and can also withstand afterburning temperatures in conventional flight to achieve supersonic speeds. The lifting/propulsion system with its Three Bearing Swivel Duct Nozzle (3BSD) most closely resembles plans for the Convair Model 200 Sea Control Fighter of 1973 than the preceding generation of STOVL designs to which the Harrier belongs.

The team responsible for developing the propulsion system included Lockheed Martin, Northrop Grumman, BAE Systems, Pratt & Whitney and Rolls-Royce, under the leadership of the United States Department of Defense Joint Strike Fighter Program Office. Paul Bevilaqua, Chief Engineer of Lockheed Martin Advanced Development Projects (Skunk Works), invented the lift fan propulsion system. The concept of a shaft-driven lift-fan dates back to the mid-1950s. The lift fan was demonstrated by the Allison Engine Company in 1995–97.

The U.S. Department of Defense (DOD) awarded General Electric and Rolls-Royce a $2.1 billion contract to jointly develop the F136 engine as an alternative to the F135. The LiftSystem was designed to be used with either engine. Following termination of government funding GE and Rolls-Royce terminated further development of the engine in 2011.

Rolls-Royce managed the overall development and integration program in Bristol, UK, and was also responsible for the LiftFan turbomachinery, 3BSM and Roll Post designs. Rolls-Royce in Indianapolis provided the gearbox, clutch, driveshaft and nozzle and conducted the build and verification testing of the LiftFan.

=== Operation ===
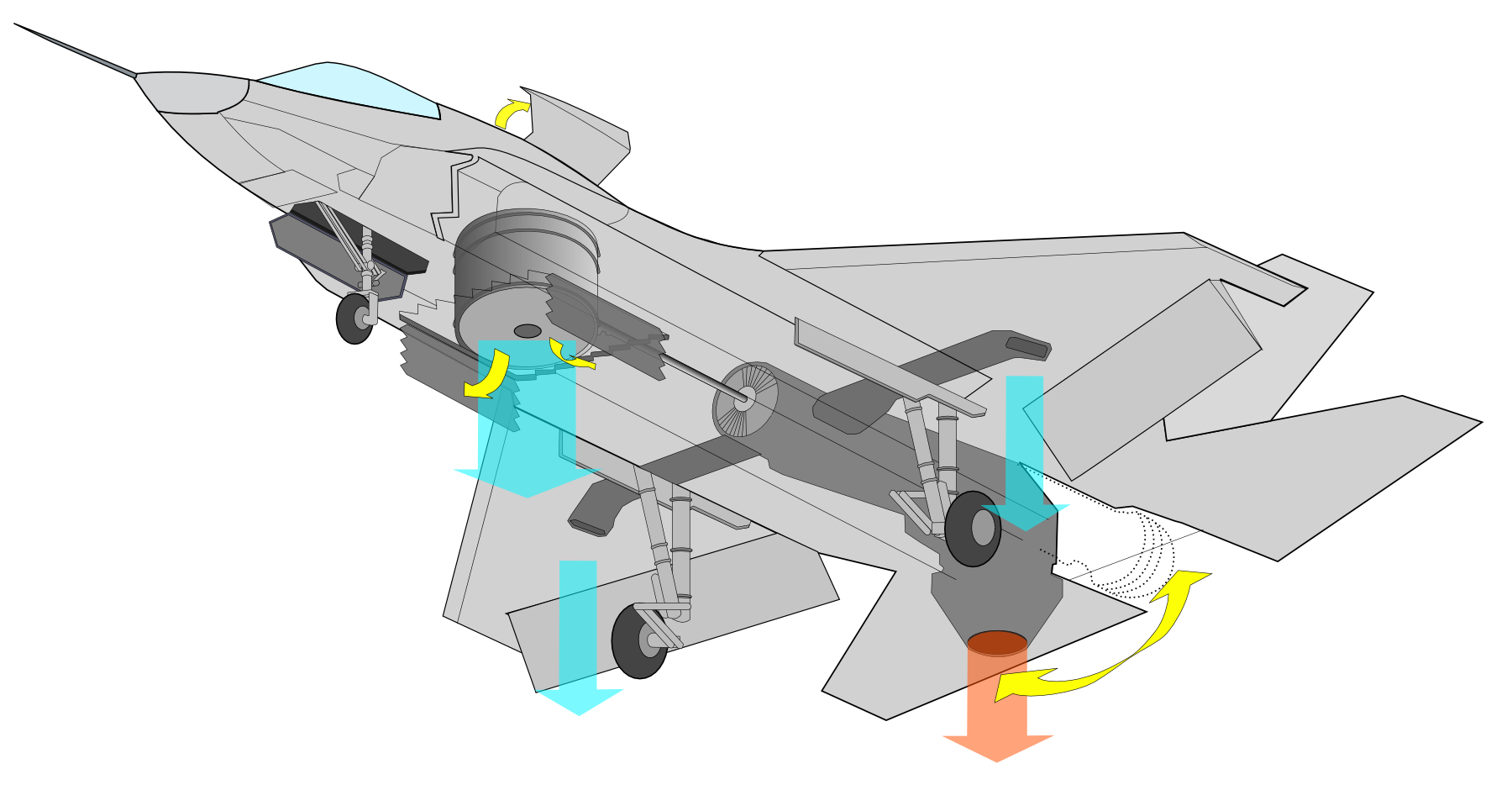
Diagram of LiftSystem components and airflow

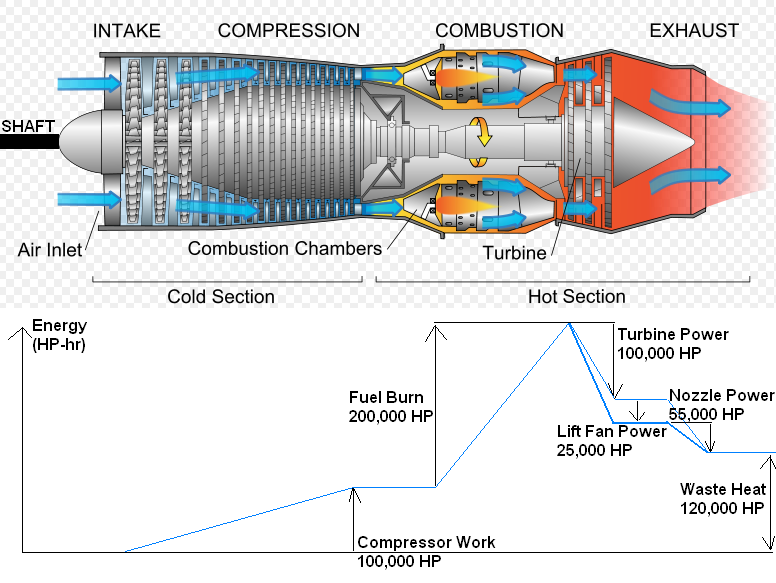
Diagram of turbojet energy for LiftSystem prototype

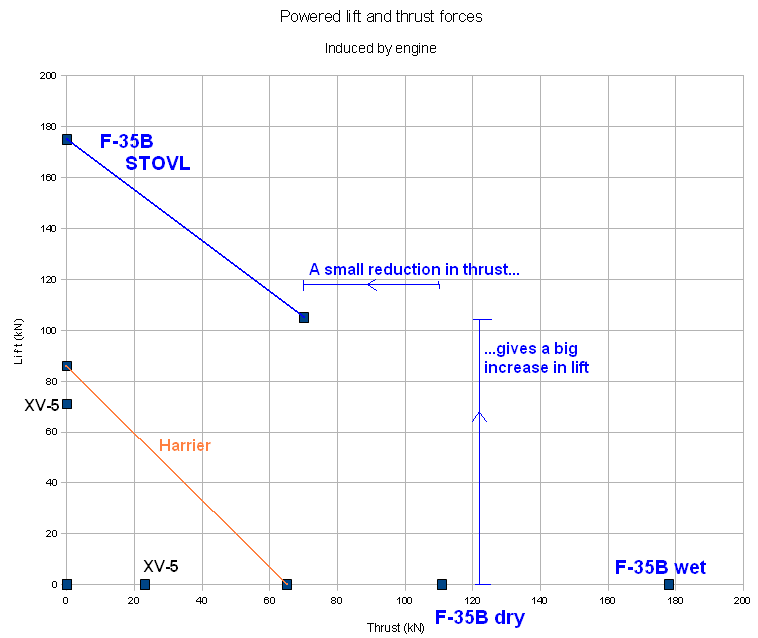
Diagram of powered lift aircraft

The Rolls-Royce LiftSystem comprises four major components:

- LiftFan
- Engine to fan driveshaft
- Three-bearing swivel module (3BSM)
- Roll posts (two)

The three-bearing swivel module (3BSM) is a thrust vectoring nozzle at the rear of the aircraft which directs engine exhaust to pass either straight through with reheat capability for forward flight, or to be deflected downward to provide lift.

For vertical flight, 29,000 hp is transferred by an extension shaft on the engine fan using a clutch and bevel-gearbox to a contra-rotating lift-fan located forward of the engine. The fan airflow (low-velocity unheated air) leaves through thrust-vectoring vanes on the underside of the aircraft, and balances the lift from the rear nozzle. For lateral stability and roll control, bypass air from the engine is used in a roll-post nozzle in each wing. For pitch control, the areas of exhaust nozzle and LiftFan inlet are varied while keeping the total lift constant. Yaw control is achieved by yawing the 3BSM. Forward, and also backward, motion is controlled by tilting the 3BSM and vanes in the LiftFan variable area vane box nozzle.

The following are the component thrust values of the system in lift mode:

Component	Thrust
3BSM, dry thrust	18,000 lbf (80 kN)
Lift fan	20,000 lbf (89 kN)
Roll posts, combined	3,900 lbf (17 kN)
Total	41,900 lbf (186 kN)

In comparison, the maximum thrust of the Rolls-Royce Pegasus 11-61/F402-RR-408, the most powerful version which is used in the AV-8B, is 23,800 pounds-force (106 kN). The weight of the AV-8B is about 46% of the weight of the F-35B.

Like lift engines, the added LiftSystem components are dead weight during flight, but the advantage of employing the LiftSystem is that its greater lift thrust increases takeoff payload by an even larger amount.

=== Engineering challenges ===
While developing the LiftSystem many engineering difficulties had to be overcome, and new technologies exploited.

The LiftFan uses hollow-bladed titanium blisks (a bladed disk or "blisk" achieved by super-plastic forming of the blades and linear friction welding to the blisk hub). Organic matrix composites are used for the interstage vanes. The LiftFan is cleared for flight up to 250 knots (130 m/s) This condition appears as a crosswind to the horizontal intake and occurs when the aircraft transitions between forward flight and hover.

The clutch mechanism uses dry plate carbon–carbon technology originally derived from aircraft brakes. Friction is only used to engage the lift fan at low engine speeds. A mechanical lock-up is engaged before increasing to full power.

The gearbox has to be able to operate with interruptions to its oil supply of up to a minute while transferring full power through 90 degrees to the LiftFan.

The Three-Bearing Swivel Module has to both support the final hot thrust vectoring nozzle and transmit its thrust loads back to the engine mounts. The "fueldraulic" actuators for the 3BSM use fuel pressurised to 3,500 pounds-force per square inch (24,000 kPa; 250 kgf/cm^{2}), rather than hydraulic fluid, to reduce weight and complexity. One actuator travels with the swivel nozzle, moving through 95 degrees while subject to intense heat and vibration.

=== Testing ===
During concept definition of the Joint Strike Fighter, two Lockheed airframes were flight-tested: the Lockheed X-35A (which was later converted into the X-35B), and the larger-winged X-35C, with the STOVL variant incorporating the Rolls-Royce LiftFan module.

LiftSystem flight testing commenced in June 2001, and on 20 July that year the X-35B became the first aircraft in history to perform a short takeoff, a level supersonic dash and vertical landing in a single flight. By the time testing had been completed in August, the aircraft had achieved 17 vertical takeoffs, 14 short takeoffs, 27 vertical landings and five supersonic flights. During the final qualifying Joint Strike Fighter flight trials, the X-35B took off in less than 500 feet (150 m), transitioned to supersonic flight, then landed vertically.

Ground tests of the F136/LiftSystem combination were carried out at the General Electric facility in Peebles, Ohio in July 2008. On 18 March 2010, a STOVL equipped F-35B performed a vertical hover and landing demonstration at Patuxent River Naval Air Station in Lexington Park, MD.

=== Collier Trophy award ===
In 2001, the LiftSystem propulsion system was awarded the Collier Trophy, in recognition of "the greatest achievement in aeronautics or astronautics in America", specifically for "improving the performance, efficiency and safety of air or space vehicles, the value of which has been thoroughly demonstrated by actual use during the preceding year."

== Specifications (LiftSystem) ==
Main engine
Pratt & Whitney F135
17,600 pounds-force (78 kN) dry thrust

Components:

LiftFan
Two-stage contra-rotating hollow titanium blisk fan of 50 inches (1.3 m) diameter. Uppermost fan fitted with variable inlet guide vanes. Capable of generating more than 20,000 pounds-force (89 kN) cold thrust
Three-bearing swivel module
Able to rotate through 95 degrees in 2.5 seconds and vector 18,000 pounds-force (80 kN) dry thrust in lift mode, with reheat capability in normal horizontal attitude
Roll posts
Two: hydraulically actuated

== Gallery ==
X-35/LiftSystem flight demonstration of transition to VTOL configuration, hover, take off in STOVL configuration, in-flight re-fuelling, vertical hover and landing.

Vertical landing demonstration showing operation of the 3BSM.

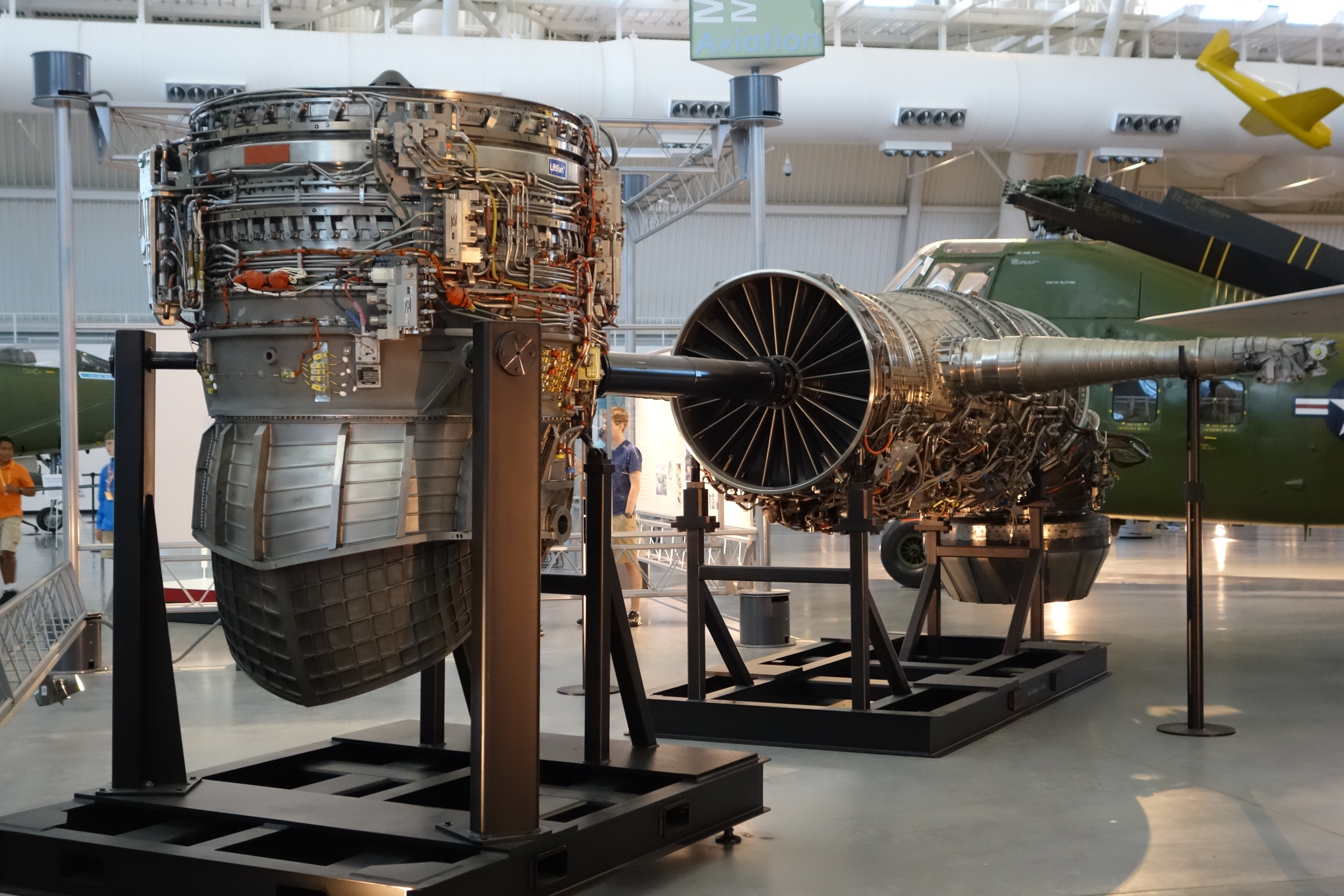
Turbine and lift fan assembly on display at the National Air and Space Museum, Steven F. Udvar-Hazy Center

== See also ==
- Boeing X-32 – Multirole combat aircraft prototype by Boeing
- Lift fan – Aircraft propulsion configuration with fans in a fixed wing
- XV-4 Hummingbird – American experimental VTOL aircraft
- Rolls-Royce RB108 – 1950s British turbojet aircraft engine
- Rolls-Royce Thrust Measuring Rig – 1950s British experimental VTOL aircraft
- Yakovlev Yak-38 – VTOL strike aircraft; only operational VTOL strike aircraft of the Soviet Navy

Related lists

- List of aircraft engines
