= Pierre Perrier =

French academic, born 1935

Pierre Perrier was born on 30 June 1935. He is known both for his work in aeronautics and for his research on the transmission of the gospels.

== Career in aeronautics ==
He has been responsible for research and advanced studies in the aeronautics industry. On 9 April 1990, he was elected a corresponding member of the French Academy of sciences. He was Delegate General of the French Academy of Technologies from 2001 to 2004. He is a specialist in computational fluid mechanics.

He is a member of the initiative group created in February 2005, "Scientific Computation".

== Gospels and oral traditions ==
Pierre Perrier has published numerous works on oral tradition in the gospels. His books try to show the importance of the study of oral traditions in the nascent Judeo-Christian Church in order to better understand how the Gospels were transmitted in the early years of the Church. His research is in line with the work carried out by the Jesuit Marcel Jousse, Cardinal Tisserant, Cardinal Jean Daniélou... His approach draws on the sources of the little-known traditions of the Eastern Churches, in particular the Chaldean Catholic Church.

== Theories and controversies ==
=== Thomas in China ===
In 2008, Pierre Perrier, in association with Chinese researchers, published a theory according to which, in 64, Thomas would have left by boat for China, called by Emperor Mingdi. The first contact would have taken place between Thomas and Prince Ying, a relative of the emperor, in a valley located in present-day Kyrgyzstan, a region where Aramaic was spoken at the time. According to Chinese sources, Prince Ying had gone to this region to buy horses needed to guard the emperor he was leading. Once in China, Thomas founded several churches in the port of Lianyungang and in Luoyang, the capital. The sculpted cliff of Kong Wang Shan at Lianyungang, contemporary with his preaching (c. end of 60 early 70), contains 105 figures over 15 metres in length and makes it possible to reconstruct the circumstances of his preaching. Pierre Perrier and his team also rely on Chinese literature, which he describes as abundant. He identifies more than twenty Judeo-Christian signs in the fresco and emphasizes that there are no symbols that can be linked to the Roman vision, but that the representations refer to the Parthian society. Thomas would then go back to southern India. Pierre Perrier points out that, with the exception of this preaching in China, where Thomas had the help of a translator who had converted, the map of Christian preaching in Asia in the first century corresponds to the regions where Aramaic was spoken. He believes that the centre of the organization of this preaching was in the Nineveh region. However, this recent work remains to be critically evaluated. Thus, Daniel H Bays indicates that one must remain extremely cautious about this thesis until traditional researchers become involved in this question, because the decisive proof put forward by Pierre Perrier "does not seem clear at all".

In 2009, Pierre Perrier wrote the preface to the French translation of Darwin's The Black Box, an American work that challenges Darwin's theories and develops the theory of intelligent design.
