= Delco Carousel =

Inertial Navigation system

The Delco Carousel — proper name Carousel IV — was an inertial navigation system (INS) for aircraft developed by Delco Electronics. Before the advent of sophisticated flight management systems, Carousel IV allowed pilots to automate navigation of an aircraft along a series of waypoints that they entered via a control console in the cockpit.

Carousel IV consisted of an inertial measurement unit (IMU) as its position reference, a digital computer to compute the navigation solution, and a control panel mounted in an aircraft's cockpit. It was used for long over water and over the North Pole aircraft navigation. Many aircraft were equipped with dual or triple Carousels for redundancy.

Operation was relatively simple: a pilot or flight engineer would enter the individual waypoints by their latitude and longitude points and then the pilot or engineer would enter the starting location in latitude and longitude. The system used spinning mass gyroscopes and proof-mass accelerometers to measure movement from the start point. An involved calculation followed by sampling those sensors to determine a current position relative to the surface of the Earth.

The Carousel IV system derives its name from the fact that the inertial reference platform was rotated 360° every 60 seconds as a technique to reduce drift and increase accuracy by countering systematic errors. Low drift operation was aided by maintaining the gyroscopes and accelerometers at a constant temperature of 60 °C. The elevated temperature was maintained whenever the system was switched on in either the 'Standby', 'Align', 'Navigate' or 'Attitude' mode, as selected on the Control Display Unit (CDU).

During the 1982 Falklands war, RAF Avro Vulcans were fitted with Carousels from RAF Vickers VC10s to enable Operation Black Buck.

== Applications ==
- Military: C-5A/B, KC-135 and its derivatives, C-141, Vickers VC-10
- Missiles: Thor IRBM, Titan II ICBM, Titan III heavy-lift launch system
- Spacecraft: Apollo Command Module (IMU only)
- Commercial: Boeing 747 (early variants), Airbus A300 (early variants), Concorde, McDonnell Douglas DC-10, Vickers VC-10
