= Yu-Pen Su =

Taiwanese aeronautical and mechanical engineer

Yu-Pen Su (Chinese: 蘇玉本) is a Taiwanese aerospace and mechanical engineer.

== Career ==
Su earned bachelor's and master's degrees in mechanical engineering from National Cheng Kung University in 1970 and National Taiwan University in 1974, respectively. He then earned a doctorate in mechanical and aeronautical engineering at Princeton University.

He is a consultant for the National Chung-Shan Institute of Science and Technology.

In 2022, Su was elected to the Academia Sinica. Su was elected a member of the United States National Academy of Engineering in 2024.
