= Eugene Lavretsky =

Eugene Lavretsky was named Fellow of the Institute of Electrical and Electronics Engineers in 2016 for contributions to the development of adaptive and robust flight control technologies. He works for The Boeing Company.
