= Paul Bevilaqua =

American aerospace engineer

- Born: Paul Michael Bevilaqua; May 11, 1945 (age 81); United States
- Occupation: Aeronautics engineer

Paul Michael Bevilaqua (born May 11, 1945) is an aeronautics engineer at Lockheed Martin in California, United States. In 1990, he invented the lift fan for the Joint Strike Fighter F-35B along with fellow Skunk Works engineer, Paul Shumpert.

In 2005, Bevilaqua was elected as a member of the National Academy of Engineering for his theoretical contributions, practical innovations, and increased operational utility in vertical takeoff and landing aircraft.

== Life and career ==
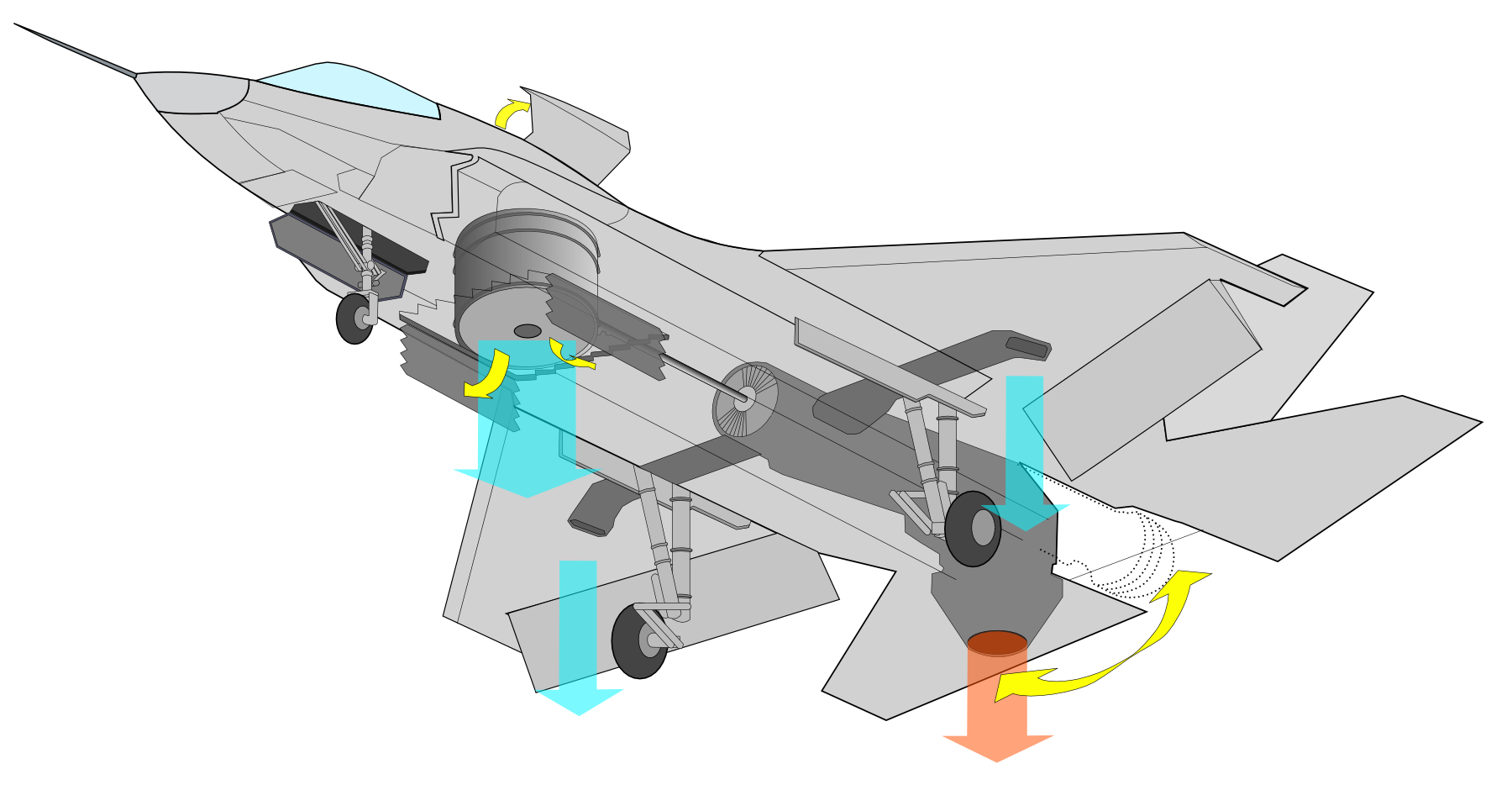
Diagram of LiftSystem components and airflow

Paul obtained a Bachelor of Science in Aerospace Engineering from the University of Notre Dame in 1967 and participated on the men's fencing team.

Bevilaqua obtained his Doctorate in Aeronautics and Astronautics with a focus on Turbulent wakes at Purdue University in 1973. He was also an Air Force Lieutenant at Wright-Patterson Air Force Base (WP-AFB), where he began professional work in 1971. He became Deputy Director of the Energy Conversion Lab at WP-AFB, managed by jet inventor Hans von Ohain. In 1975, Paul left the Air Force to be a Manager of Advanced Programs at Rockwell International's Navy Aircraft Plant. In 1985, he was appointed Chief Aeronautical Scientist at Lockheed, trying to come up with a new line of business.

Hans von Ohain inspired Bevilaqua to think like an engineer rather than a mathematician - "in school I learned how to move the pieces, and Hans taught me how to play chess", although he said that about Purdue as well. Ohain also showed Bevilaqua "what those TS-diagrams actually mean".

While at WP, Ohain, Bevilaqua and others investigated and patented various flow related concepts, some of them being flow multipliers related to vertical take-off and landing.

== Invention of LiftFan ==
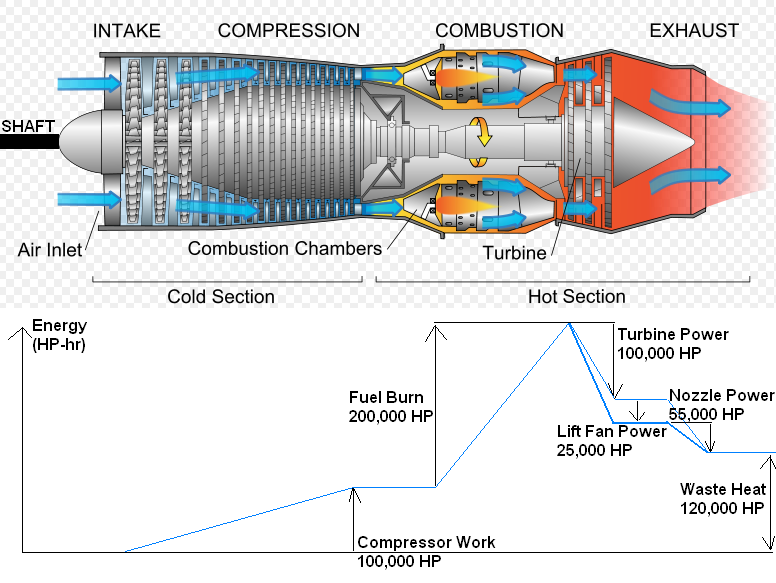
Diagram of turbojet energy for LiftSystem

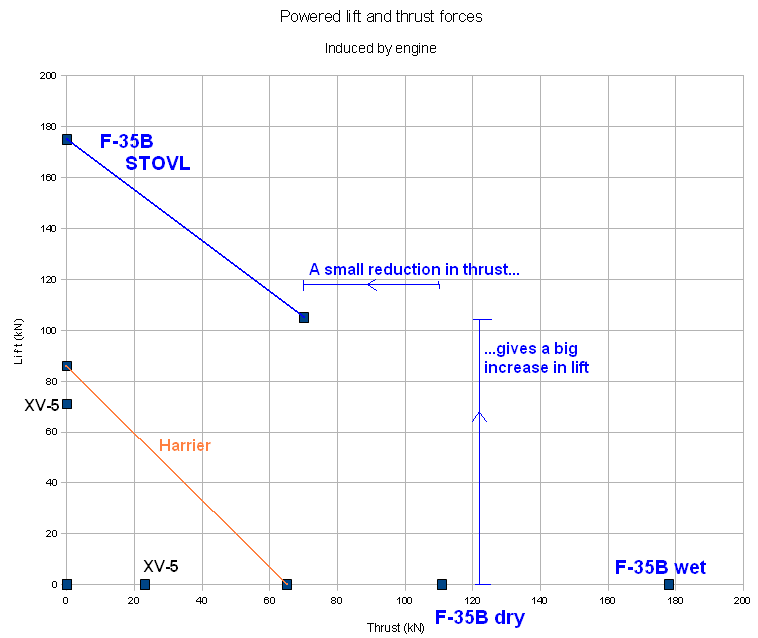
Diagram of powered lift aircraft

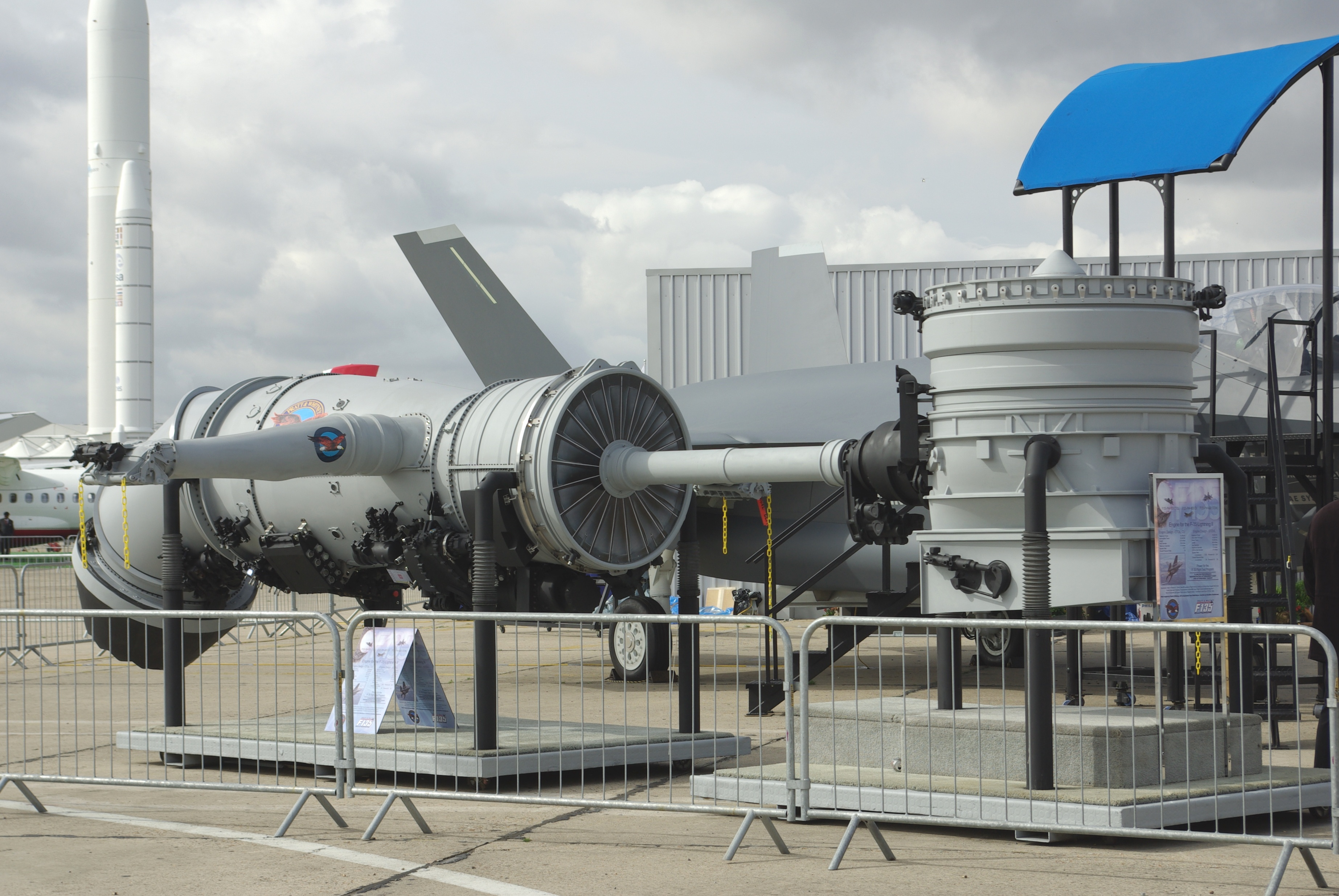
The F135 engine with lift fan, roll posts, and rear vectoring nozzle, as designed for the F-35B, at the Paris Air Show, 2007

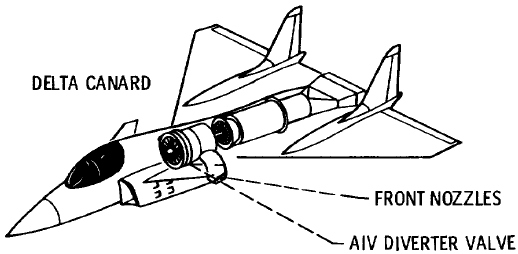
NASA version of TandemFan

In the 1980s, the United States Marine Corps wanted a Vertical/Short Takeoff and Landing (V/STOVL) aircraft with more speed and payload than the Harrier/AV-8B.

Bevilaqua was working for Lockheed Skunk Works in 1986, when DARPA and the similar British agency launched a program called ASTOVL and issued a 9-month contract to develop concepts for a stealthy supersonic STOVL plane, in accordance with USMC wishes, but without the usual strict technical requirements.

The challenge in combining supersonic flight and STOVL is that an engine powerful enough to lift an aircraft would be too wide to be supersonic, as shown by the Harrier. A smaller engine with higher air flow was needed, but seemed impossible.
Inspired by the General Electric CJ805-23 aft-turbofan and the Rolls-Royce tandem-fan, an appropriate system seemed to be a dual thrust system with a lift vector at the front and a swivel nozzle at the back for the jet engine, counterbalancing each other.

Many options were investigated, but with one month left and no results, Bevilagua took another look at the situation. Three elements were clear:

- a turbine is the best way of extracting power from a jet
- a shaft is the best way of transferring that power forward
- a fan is the best way of converting power to thrust or lift

Exploiting bypass air is the usual way of increasing thrust, but when air flow drops so does pressure, which increases engine speed at the risk of failure. This apparent flaw suddenly turned to a benefit when it dawned upon him that the extra engine power could be put to good use by turning a lift fan. "It took eight months of brainstorming to program the computer in my head, and ten seconds to come up with the idea."

The solution involved transforming some of the jet blast to vertical air flow by extracting energy from the hot jet blast with a turbine that turns a shaft driving a fan pointing down, thereby increasing impulse and thus lift, without increasing drag. The transition between horizontal and vertical lift needs to be precisely controlled, and the two lift columns need to be carefully balanced, to maintain control of the aircraft.

The system works similarly to a turbofan, with an extra bypass fan moved and tilted 90 degrees to move cool unburned air vertically instead of horizontally, or a turbine helicopter whose rotor is shrunk and encased. This effect is similar to the previous flow multiplier concepts investigated by Bevilaqua (see #List of Papers) and others (although methods are different), achieving a lift/thrust-ratio of 1.5:1 where previous successful aircraft were limited to 1:1 at best.

Bevilaqua is not a propulsion engineer, and got help from various Lockheed experts in propulsion, materials, and other specialized fields to verify the theories of the concept, which were then patented in 1990-93.

Both DARPA and the Marine Corps approved of the concept, and from there, it developed through various defense programs such as CALF and JAST into the Joint Strike Fighter Program and through to the X-35B and F-35B. Bevilaqua was a key figure in persuading the Air Force in 1992 that the concept aircraft could be useful as a conventional aircraft without the LiftFan. When the US Navy also came on board, the road was paved for the JSF concept of similar aircraft with different applications, in accordance with JAST Concept Exploration findings.

The practical development and testing of the F135 engine and system was performed by Pratt & Whitney, Allison Engine Company, NASA, Rolls-Royce and others.

One of the key factors in handing the $200B JSF contract to LM is said to be when the X-35B took off from 150 feet of runway, went supersonic, and landed vertically in one flight on July 20, 2001 - a performance that only the X-35B had done, and only because of the LiftFan concept.

The JSF team was awarded the Collier Trophy in 2001 for the working system, and Bevilaqua received the Paul E. Haueter Memorial Award (American Helicopter Society) in 2004.

== List of Papers ==
Paul M. Bevilaqua, "Evaluation of Hypermixing for Thrust Augmenting Ejectors," Journal of Aircraft, Vol. 11, No. 6, June 1974, pp. 348–354
Paul M. Bevilaqua, "Analytic Description of Hypermixing and Test of an Improved Nozzle," Journal of Aircraft, Vol. 13, No. 1, January 1976, pp. 43–48
Paul M. Bevilaqua, "Lifting Surface Theory for Thrust-Augmenting Ejectors," AIAA Journal, Vol. 16, No. 5, May 1978, pp. 475–581).
Paul M. Bevilaqua and Paul S. Lykoudis "Turbulence memory in self-preserving wakes", Journal of Fluid Mechanics, Volume 89, Issue 03, December 1978, pp 589–606
Paul M. Bevilaqua, Howard L. Toms Jr "A Comparison Test of the Hypermixing Nozzle."
Paul M. Bevilaqua, John D. Lee, "Development of a Nozzle to Improve the Turning of Supersonic Coanda Jets" (1980)
Paul M. Bevilaqua, "Joint Strike Fighter Dual-Cycle Propulsion System", Journal of Propulsion and Power, 2005, vol. 21, no. 5, pp. 778–783
