= John V. Breakwell =

American control theorist

- Born: 1917; Switzerland
- Died: April 16, 1991 (aged 74)
- Citizenship: American
- Education: Harvard University
- Awards: Richard E. Bellman Control Heritage Award (1983)
- Scientific career
- Fields: Control theory

John Valentine Breakwell (1917 – April 16, 1991) was a noted American control theorist and a Professor of Astronautics at Stanford University. He is remembered for his contributions to the "science and applications of astrodynamics, for discovery of flight-trajectory optimization, and for outstanding academic service." He was elected to the National Academy of Engineering in 1981 and a recipient of the Richard E. Bellman Control Heritage Award in 1983.
