= Combustion, Explosion, and Shock Waves =

- Discipline: Physical chemistry of combustion
- Language: English
- Edited by: Anatoly A. Vasil'ev

Publication details
- History: 1965-present
- Publisher: MAIK Nauka/Interperiodica and Springer Science+Business Media
- Frequency: Bimonthly
- Impact factor: 1.085 (2021)

Standard abbreviations
- ISO 4: Combust. Explos. Shock Waves

Indexing
- ISSN: 0010-5082 (print); 1573-8345 (web)
- OCLC no.: 1564276

Links
- Journal homepage; Online archive; Journal page at MAIK Nauka/Interperiodica

Combustion, Explosion, and Shock Waves (Russian: Fizika Goreniya i Vzryva, Физика горения и взрыва) is the English-language translated version of the Russian peer-reviewed scientific journal, Fizika Goreniya i Vzryva. It covers the combustion of gases and materials, detonation processes, dispersal and transformation of substances, and shock-wave propagation. The editor-in-chief is Anatoly A. Vasil'ev.

== Abstracting and indexing ==
The journal is abstracted and indexed in:

- Current Contents/Physical, Chemical and Earth Sciences
- Science Citation Index Expanded
- Scopus
- Inspec
- Chemical Abstracts Service
- EI-Compendex

According to the Journal Citation Reports, the journal has a 2020 impact factor of 0.946.
