= Olivier de Weck =

Professor of Astronautics and Systems Engineering

Olivier Ladislas de Weck
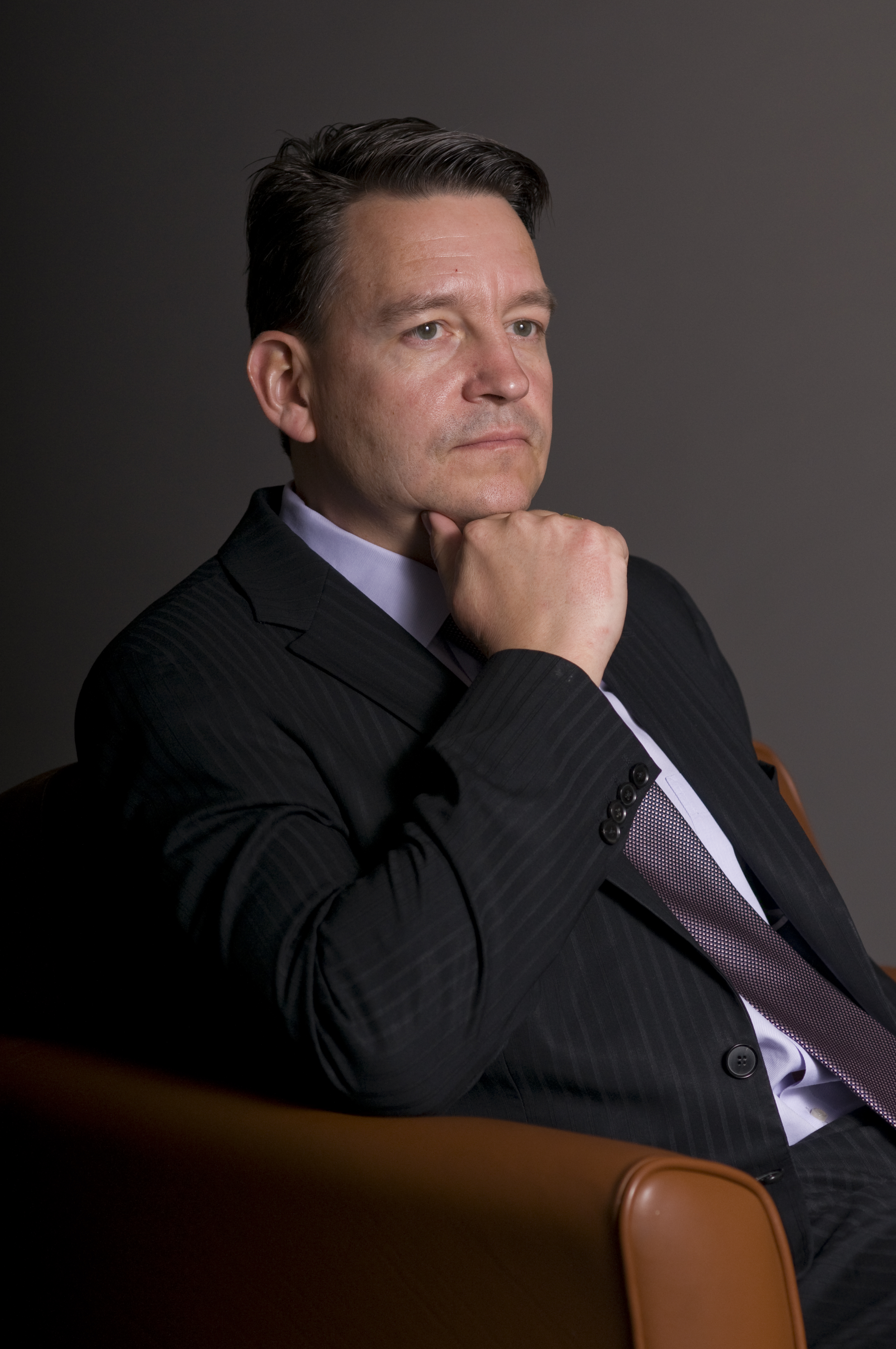
- Born: 1968 (age 57–58); Bern, Switzerland
- Known for: multidisciplinary system optimization, space exploration, systems engineering, "ilities", space logistics, remote sensing
- Scientific career
- Fields: Astronautics, Systems Engineering, Design optimization
- Institutions: Massachusetts Institute of Technology; École Polytechnique Fédérale de Lausanne; ETH Zurich; Airbus
- Website: MIT Engineering Systems Laboratory

Olivier L. de Weck (born 1968) is the Apollo Program Professor of Astronautics and Engineering Systems at the Massachusetts Institute of Technology (MIT). He has authored and co-authored more than 400 peer-reviewed publications. He is a Fellow of the INCOSE and a Fellow of the AIAA. He is the Editor-in-Chief of the Journal of Spacecraft and Rockets. From 2013-2018 de Weck served as the Editor-in-Chief for Systems Engineering, the leading journal of INCOSE. He is best known for contributions to the fields of Systems Engineering, Design optimization, and Space Logistics, where together with colleagues from JPL he coined the term Interplanetary Supply Chain. More recently he has become active in the field of Remote Sensing.

== Education and research ==
de Weck earned a Dipl. Ing. degree in Industrial Engineering from ETH Zurich in 1993. Between 1993 and 1997 he worked as a liaison engineer and engineering program manager on the Swiss F/A-18 fighter aircraft program in St. Louis, MO. He earned both a S.M. degree in Aeronautics and Astronautics in 1999 and a Ph.D. in Aerospace Systems in 2001 from MIT. His doctoral dissertation titled "Multivariable isoperformance methodology for precision opto-mechanical systems" was supervised by David W. Miller who served as NASA's Chief Technologist.

de Weck joined the MIT faculty in 2001 where he has a dual appointment with the Department of Aeronautics and Astronautics and the Institute for Data, Systems, and Society (IDSS). He previously served on the National Research Council Committee on Cost Growth in NASA Earth and Space Science Missions (2009–2010) and as the Executive Director of the MIT Production in the Innovation Economy (PIE) Study (2010–2013). Between 2011-2016 he served as the co-director of the Center for Complex Engineering Systems at KACST and MIT. As of 2015 he serves as the faculty director of the MIT-Switzerland program.

de Weck leads the Strategic Engineering Research Group in the MIT Engineering Systems Laboratory which emphasizes "the process of architecting and designing complex systems and products in a way that deliberately accounts for future uncertainty and context in order to maximize their lifecycle value." Past research has been sponsored by organizations such as NASA, DARPA, Xerox, and BP.

== Contributions ==
de Weck developed or supervised development of a number of methods and tools including:

- Isoperformance method to find performance-invariant designs
- Adaptive Weighted Sum (AWS) method to find equidistant Pareto optimal solutions
- Delta Design Structure Matrix (ΔDSM) to quantify the impact of new technology on an underlying system
- Time Expanded Decision Networks to make decisions under uncertainty
- Generalized Multi-commodity Network Flows (GMCNF) to find optimal resource routing through geospatially distributed infrastructure
- SpaceNet space logistics discrete event simulation software

From 2017-2018 de Weck took a two-year professional leave of absence from MIT to serve as the Senior Vice President for Technology Planning and Roadmapping at Airbus in Toulouse, France. His recent research focuses on long term Technology Planning and Roadmapping.

== Awards and honors ==
- INCOSE Systems Engineering Journal Best Paper of the Year (2007)
- Capers and Marion McDonald Award for Excellence in Mentoring and Advising (2010)
- INCOSE Systems Engineering Journal Best Paper of the Year (2010)
- International Conference on Engineering Design 2011 Reviewer's Favorite Paper Award (2011)
- Honorable Mention, American Publishers Award for Professional and Scholarly Excellence (PROSE Award) in Engineering and Technology (2011)
- INCOSE Systems Engineering Journal Best Paper of the Year (2020)

== Selected works ==
de Weck co-authored a book presenting the argument for Engineering Systems as a new discipline:

- de Weck, Olivier L.; Roos, Daniel; Magee, Christopher L. (October 2011). Engineering Systems: Meeting Human Needs in a Complex Technological World. Cambridge, MA: MIT Press. ISBN 9780262016704.

He appears in videos discussing the need for and technical challenges of interplanetary space exploration:

- "Humanity as a multi-planet species". Adapt & Thrive: TEDxLakeGeneva. 14 May 2014.
- "Interplanetary Space Logistics: Enabling New Frontiers". MIT TechTV. 11 September 2007.

and is quoted in media coverage of research to use planetary bodies such as the moon as intermediate in-situ sources of propellants and other resources:

- Jennifer Chu (14 Oct 2015). "To save on weight, a detour to the moon is the best route to Mars". MIT News.
- Bruce Dorminey (16 Oct 2015). "NASA's Human Mars Missions Could First Fuel Up Near Moon". Forbes.

He has also published many articles in professional and academic publications such as:

- de Weck, Olivier (1 June 2009). "What To Pack For Mars: A successful mission requires a well-planned supply strategy".
- de Weck, O. L.; Neufville, R. D.; Chaize, M. (2004). "Staged Deployment of Communications Satellite Constellations in Low Earth Orbit". Journal of Aerospace Computing, Information, and Communication. 1 (3): 119. doi:10.2514/1.6346.
- de Weck, O. L.; Jones, M. B. (2006). "Isoperformance: Analysis and design of complex systems with desired outcomes". Systems Engineering. 9: 45–61. doi:10.1002/sys.20043. S2CID 6625099.
