= Hsiao-hua Burke =

Aerospace engineer for MIT Lincoln Laboratory

Hsiao-hua Burke is an aerospace engineer at the MIT Lincoln Laboratory in Lexington, Massachusetts. She was named a member of the National Academy of Engineering in 2024 for her contributions to the field of remote sensing and missile defense.
