= Alison Nordt =

American aerospace engineer

Alison Audrey Nordt is an American aerospace engineer known for her work developing space telescopes including NIRCam, the primary imaging device on the James Webb Space Telescope. She is Director for Space Science and Instrumentation at Lockheed Martin.

== Education and career ==
As a child, Nordt lived in New Jersey, but she moved with her family to Virginia following a move of the family business. She became a high school student at North Cross School in Roanoke, Virginia, where she graduated in 1988. Because North Cross had no girls' soccer team, she played for the boys' team, which won the 2022 Virginia Independent Conference title. She has been interested in space for as long as she can remember, and while a teenager, she was a regular attendee of Space Camp, where she also worked as a counselor as a college student.

After majoring in mechanical engineering at Cornell University and graduating in 1992, she continued her studies in aeronautics and astronautics at Stanford University, receiving both a master's degree and a Ph.D. there in 1994 and 1999 respectively. Her doctoral research focused on composite materials; her doctoral dissertation, Design of Alpine Skis, was supervised by George S. Springer.

She has worked for Lockheed since completing her Ph.D. in 1999, and began working on the NIRCam project there in 2002. She is also a trustee of the Planetary Science Institute.

== Recognition ==
Nordt was named as the 2023 Engineer of the Year by the American Institute of Aeronautics and Astronautics (AIAA), and became an AIAA Fellow in 2024. She was elected to the National Academy of Engineering in 2025, "for contributions to aerospace and space science through development of novel instruments and space missions, extending understanding of the universe".

Nordt is the 2024 recipient of the North Cross School Distinguished Alumni Award.
