= George S. Schairer =

American aerospace engineer (1913–2004)

- Born: May 19, 1913; Wilkinsburg, Pennsylvania, U.S.
- Died: October 28, 2004 (aged 91); Kirkland, Washington, U.S.
- Education: Swarthmore (BS 1934), Massachusetts Institute of Technology (MS 1935)
- Occupation: Aeronautical engineer
- Known for: Aircraft design
- Spouse: Pauline
- Children: George, Mary, Sally, John
- Awards: Daniel Guggenheim Medal (1967)

George S. Schairer (May 19, 1913 – October 28, 2004) was an aerodynamicist at Consolidated Aircraft and Boeing whose design innovations became standard on virtually all types of military and passenger jet planes.

== Early life ==
George Swift Schairer was born in Wilkinsburg, Pennsylvania, on May 19, 1913. His father, Dr. Otto Schairer, was one of the founders of KDKA, the first commercial broadcasting station in the U.S., and also a pioneer in electronic television. He received a bachelor's degree in engineering from Swarthmore in 1934 and a master's degree in engineering from the Massachusetts Institute of Technology in 1935.

== Early career ==
After working for Bendix Aviation, Schairer joined Consolidated Aircraft, where he led the aerodynamic design effort of the Consolidated XP4Y Corregidor and the Consolidated B-24 Liberator. He was one of the engineers responsible for the incorporation of the Davis wing in these designs. At Consolidated Aircraft, he also gained extensive experience in the design of controls for aircraft.

== Career at Boeing ==
In 1939, Edmund T. "Eddie" Allen—the test pilot who led Boeing's Research Division—hired Schairer to be chief of the company's aerodynamics unit, replacing Ralph Cram, who had been killed in the March 18 crash of the prototypeBoeing 307 Stratoliner. Schairer helped redesign the plane's vertical tail, then to test the aircraft, which would become the first pressurized airliner to enter service. He also was involved in the development of the Boeing B-17 Flying Fortress—in particular, the replacement of spring tabs with aerodynamically balanced control surfaces on the B-17E. During the design of the Boeing B-29 Superfortress, he was responsible for the incorporation of the Boeing 117 wing airfoil, which had been designed for use on the Boeing XPBB Sea Ranger. Working with Allen, he also helped defend the use of a much higher wing loading (69 lbs/sq foot) on the B-29 than had been used on previous designs. This was accomplished by the use of a powerful flap system that allowed good low-speed performance.

== Boeing adoption of swept wings ==
In Germany after World War II, Schairer was part of a team that collected documents, designs and wind tunnel data on swept-wings up to Mach 1.2. Impressed by the research, he informed Boeing to halt work on the XB-47 Stratojet and to modify it with a 35° sweep; it won the medium bomber competition and over 2,000 were built. He also conceptualised the B-47 podded engines.

On May 10, he wrote a seven-page letter to Boeing colleague Bob Withington that included a drawing of the swept wing and, in cramped handwriting, presented the key mathematical formulas. To avoid delay, Schairer wrote "Censored" on the envelope and mailed it, he led the effort to overhaul the B47 design upon returning from Germany. The engineers led by Theodore von Kármán were searching through technical data at captured German research centers in 1945, Schairer found test results at the Völkenrode research center.

== Birth of the B-52 ==
On Thursday, October 21, 1948, Schairer and Boeing engineers Art Carlsen and Vaughn Blumenthal presented the design of a four-engine turboprop bomber to the Air Force chief of bomber development, Col. Pete Warden. Warden, looked over the turboprop data and was clearly disappointed. He asked if the Boeing team could come up with an updated proposal for a four-engine turbojet bomber. Joined by Ed Wells, Boeing vice president of Engineering, the engineers worked that night in the Hotel Van Cleve and redesigned Boeing's proposal to be a four-engine turbojet bomber. On Friday, Col. Warden carefully looked over the new charts and graphs and asked for a better design. Returning to the Hotel Van Cleve, the Boeing team was joined by Bob Withington and Maynard Pennell, two top Boeing engineers who just happened to be in town on other business.

By late Friday night, they had laid out what was essentially a new airplane. The new design featured a wing that was swept back at 35 degrees with a 185-foot span. More significantly, it featured eight jet engines. After a Saturday morning trip to a local hobby shop for balsa wood, glue, carving tools and silver paint, Schairer set to work building a model. The rest of the team focused on weight and performance data. Wells, who was also a skilled artist, completed the aircraft drawings. On Sunday, a stenographer was hired to type a clean copy of the proposal. On Monday, Schairer presented Col. Warden with a neatly bound 33-page proposal and a beautiful 14-inch scale model on a stand. The result was a contract to build what became the Boeing B-52 Stratofortress.

== Development of the 707 ==
In October 1949, one year after the creation of the B-52 concept, Schairer and Ed Wells were in Dayton Ohio examining wind tunnel data of an improved wing for the B-52 with Boeing aerodynamicist John Alexander. Their conversation turned to the concept of a civil jet transport. On the spot, they designed and sketched out a low-wing transport using essentially the B-52 wing design, with jet engines in separate pods on swept-back wings and a tricycle landing gear that retracted into the body. When the three engineers returned to Seattle, they passed their design on to the preliminary design group.

After the US Air Force in November 1950 asked Boeing to look at tanker/transport aircraft that would be a significant improvement over the Boeing KC-97 Stratofreighter, design studies were begun. This design eventually evolved into the Boeing 367-80, which Schairer was heard to observe was not different than design he, Ed Wells and John Alexander had sketched in October 1949. Schairer, who became the head of the technical staff at Boeing in 1951, oversaw the development of the 367–80, KC-135 Stratotanker and Boeing 707 airliner.

== Later career ==
As Assistant Chief Engineer, Schairer led Boeing's design efforts for what was then called "Weapon System 110A", a supersonic bomber for the US Air Force. In the end, North American Aviation won the contract to build what was named the North American XB-70 Valkyrie. He was also involved in the design of the Boeing 727, Boeing 737 and Boeing 747.

From 1959 to 1973, as vice president for research and development at Boeing, Schairer oversaw Boeing's technical staff, including the engineers who conducted structural analyses and tested a plane's flight controls, hydraulics and electrical systems. He retired from Boeing in 1978.

In 1957, he received the Daniel Guggenheim Medal, whose previous recipients included Orville Wright, Charles Lindbergh and William Boeing. He received the Spirit of St. Louis Medal in 1957 and was elected to the National Academy of Sciences in 1968. He received an honorary doctorate in engineering from Swarthmore in 1958. Schairer was the recipient of the prestigious Pathfinder Award, bestowed by Seattle's Museum of Flight in 1985.
