= What Engineers Know and How They Know It =

Epistemological study of the development of engineering knowledge

- Cover of 1 ed edition, paperback
- Author: Walter G. Vincenti
- Language: English
- Subject: History of technology, Aeronautical history
- Publisher: Johns Hopkins University Press
- Publication date: 1990
- Publication place: United States
- Media type: Paperback
- Pages: 326
- ISBN: 0-8018-3974-2 (a1k. paper) ISBN 0-8018-4588-2 (pbk.)

What Engineers Know and How they Know It: Analytical Studies from Aeronautical History (The Johns Hopkins University Press, 1990) is a historical reflection on engineering practice in US aeronautics from 1908 to 1953 written by Walter Vincenti (1917–2019) an accomplished practitioner and instructor. This period represents the dawn of aviation which was fraught with uncertainties and numerous paths to many possible worlds. The book captures two main conclusions from this period. The first is about "what engineers know". Five case studies from the history of aeronautical engineering are used to argue engineering often demands its own scientific discoveries. Thus, engineering should be understood as a knowledge-generating activity that includes applied science but is not limited to applied science. The second conclusion of the book pertains to "how engineers know" by using the same case studies to reveal patterns in the nature of all engineering. These patterns form an “epistemology” of engineering that may point the way to an “engineering method” as something distinct from scientific method. Walter Vincenti ends the work with a general "variation-selection model" for understanding the direction of technological innovation in human history. The book is filled with numerous additional observations and stories told by a practitioner and instructor. This may be why Dr. Michael A. Jackson, author of Structured Design and Problem Frames, once concluded a keynote address to engineers with the statement, "Read Vincenti's book. Read it carefully. Read it one hundred times."

== Author ==
Walter G. Vincenti (commonly pronounced "vin-sen-tee" in the US or "vin-chen-tee" in Italian) (1917–2019) was a professor emeritus of Aeronautical and Aerospace Engineering at Stanford University. In 1987 he was inducted into the National Academy of Engineering, “for pioneering contributions to supersonic aircraft aerodynamics and to fundamental understanding of the physical gas dynamics of hypersonic flow.” His important textbook from the first part of his career is, Introduction to Physical Gas Dynamics (1ed ed 1965, 2nd ed 1975). Vincenti in effect had two whole careers: one as a cutting-edge aeronautical engineer and another as a leading historian of technology. This gave him a dual vantage point to think about how technological innovation works. Further, he broadened the relevance of engineering to society by co-founding a Stanford discipline called Values, Technology and Society in 1971—now called Science, Technology and Society. At the age of 90 he published his most recent work with William M. Newman, "On an Engineering Use of Engineering History" which appears in Technology and Culture.

== Background ==
What Engineers Know was first published in 1990 when Mr. Vincenti was 73 years old after full careers in aerospace engineering, the history of technology, and instructing. The five case studies used for evidence in this book come from the first half of the 20th century, 1908–1953. During this period the author worked at the National Advisory Committee for Aeronautics (NACA) from 1940 to 1957. Four of the five case studies used as evidence in this book were first published independently in Technology and Culture between 1979 and 1986. During this era, other authors were beginning to refute the view of engineering as only applied science. Then in 1990, Vincenti's five case studies indirectly supported this newer discourse about engineering as a knowledge-generating discipline.

== Scope ==
The profession of "engineering" encompasses a wide scope of practice. Thus, the author narrows the scope of his five case studies in three ways. First, viewed end-to-end, the engineering process contains three phases including design, construction/production and operation. These cases come largely from the design phase of engineering. One exception is the fifth case study on flush-riveted joints which involved an intimate interplay between design and production. Second, design can be categorized as normal or radical. These case studies pertain to normal design. Third, normal design itself is multi-leveled. These levels proceed from project definition down to overall design, major component design, subdivision of component design, and highly specific problems (like planform, airfoil and high-lift devices). These five case studies come mostly from these lower levels. Thus when combined, the scope of these case studies is design, normal design and highly specific problems at the lowest level, "to help redress the neglect of this large and essential area."

== Case Study Summary (What Engineers Know) ==
The five case studies are organized by chapter. Chapter 2 regards airfoil design generally. The early work of Davis illustrates how useful engineering has been done by people who have no formal training in engineering. The Davis wing was instrumental even though Davis did not have the theoretical basis to know how or why. Chapter 3 is about how engineers design in accord with flying qualities satisfactory to pilots. This case study illustrates there can be a key relationship between human behavior and engineering requirements that can greatly affect the outcomes. As such, "artifactual design is a social activity." Chapter 4 instructs the importance of control-volume analysis situations in mechanical design. Control volume analysis was missing in physics textbooks at the time. Thus, engineers had a scientific requirement that was not addressed adequately by any natural science. Importantly, such case studies are examples of why there is such a thing as "engineering science". Chapter 5 regards the dynamic problem of propeller design and selection. The propeller case study illustrates how engineers develop methods to account for the absence of required scientific theory. In this case "parameter variation" was used to map-out and survey a subject where no comprehensive scientific theory (in physics) existed. Finally, chapter 6 describes the problem of designing flush-riveted joints for aircraft. This case study conveys how requirements of production can have a reverse influence on design thus driving iterations between production and design. This case study also illustrates how there are aspects of engineering that cannot adequately be described as science such as the "feel" rivet mechanics developed for how much pressure to apply when completing the aircraft's aluminum stressed-skin structure (see "tacit knowledge" discussion below).

== An Epistemology of Engineering (How Engineers Know) ==
Throughout the book, Walter Vincenti makes epistemology observations pertaining to engineering. The following are six of several observations made throughout the book. These observations do not constitute an "engineering method" per se but offer a conjecture that they may point the way for further research. He wrote, "in the final paragraph of chapter 5, I also raised the question of whether it might be profitable to look for "engineering method" analogous to but distinguishable from scientific method that has been a fruitful concern for the history of science. Could it be that the variation-selection process outlined here is that method, with its distinctive features lying in the criterion of selection and the vicarious methods used to shortcut direct trial?"

=== Seven Interactive Elements of Engineering Learning ===
First, there is a pattern to the iterative engineering discovery process seen in the development of flying-quality specifications. This process is referred to as "Seven Interactive Elements of Engineering Learning" and includes:

1. **Familiarization with** vehicle and recognition of **problem**.
2. **Identification of** basic variables and derivation of analytical concepts and **criteria**.
3. **Development of** instruments/piloting techniques for in-flight **measurements**.
4. **Growth** and refinement **of** pilot **opinion** regarding desirable flying qualities.
5. Combine results from 2-4 into a deliberate **scheme for** flying-quality **research**.
6. **Measurement of** relevant flight **characteristics** for a cross section of aircraft.
7. **Assessment of results** and data on flight characteristics in light of pilot opinion to arrive at general specifications.

The boldface from the original text isolates the steps in a subject-neutral manner.

=== Six Categories of Engineering Knowledge ===
Second, there is a pattern in the very categories of knowledge in engineering. These six categories of engineering knowledge are:

1. Fundamental design concepts
2. Criteria and specifications
3. Theoretical tools
4. Quantitative data
5. Practical considerations
6. Design instrumentalities

=== Seven Knowledge-Generating Activities ===
Third, Walter Vincenti sees a pattern in knowledge/science generating activities of engineering. These seven Knowledge-Generating Activities include:

1. Transfer from science
2. Invention
3. Theoretical engineering research
4. Experimental engineering research
5. Design practice
6. Production
7. Direct Trial

=== Relationship Between Categories and Activities ===
Fourth, by placing six categories of knowledge and the seven knowledge-generating activities on an x-y table, these knowledge generating activities cut across the categories of knowledge in a partially predictable way. The resulting table serves as an approximation for what engineering tasks may be likely to produce new engineering knowledge. The resulting diagram "is intended for discussion more than a set of hard and fast divisions".

=== Engineering Knowledge Classification ===
Fifth, he re-classifies engineering knowledge itself. Knowledge generated by engineering may normally be categorized by phases such as design, production or operations. Another way to think about engineering knowledge categories is descriptive knowledge, prescriptive knowledge and tacit knowledge. He adds Gilbert Ryle's terms "knowing that" and "knowing how" to illustrate the aim of each knowledge category. "Knowing what or that" to do in engineering is a mixture of descriptive and prescriptive knowledge. "Knowing how" to do it is a mixture of prescriptive and tacit knowledge. Thus, these case studies show the need for all three kinds of knowledge in engineering.

=== Variation-Selection Model of Technological Innovation ===
Finally, he posits a variation-selection model for knowledge growth. At all levels of design hierarchy, growth of knowledge acts to increase the complexity and power of the variation-selection process by modifying both the mechanism for variation and expanding the processes of selection vicariously. Variation and selection each add two realistic principles for the advancement of technology: blindness to variation and unsureness of selection.

Vincenti concludes that our blindness to the vast potential in variations of design does not imply a random or unpremeditated search. A blind person in an unfamiliar alleyway uses a cane to provide information to explore the constraints in an intentional way without having any idea where the alleyway leads. Likewise, engineers proceed in design “blindly” in the sense that “the outcome is not completely foreseeable” thus the “best” potential variations are in some degree invisible. As a result, finding high functioning designs is not the norm. He notes, “from the outside or in retrospect, the entire process tends to seem more ordered and intentional—less blind—than it usually is.”

However, Vincenti uses the differences between the Wright brothers and the French to show there is a range in how we manage blindness to variations. The Wright brothers designed a flying machine before the French even though they started experimenting at roughly the same time. The French 1) appealed to what little was known about the Wrights/Langley, 2) mental imaginings of what might succeed, and 3) guidance from growing flight experience. But “since [#1 and #3] were meager, however, the level of blindness, at least at first, was well nigh total.”

What was the difference in the process between the Wrights and the French?

The French trial and error process had less theoretical analysis (or new engineering knowledge). Since, “the French were not inclined toward theoretical analysis, variations could be selected for retention and refinement only by trails in flight.” For the Wrights, advancement of basic principles in theory via analysis lent to precise shortcuts to direct trials making the French process appear more exploratory in retrospect. Thus, the process of selection is aided by 1) theoretical analysis and 2) experiments (in, say, wind tunnels) in place of direct trial of actual (“overt”) versions in the environment. The growth in knowledge increases the power of vicarious trials in place of actual/direct trials.

==== Uncertainty In the Variation-Selection Process (blindness in variation and unsureness in selection) ====
In the long term, "the entire variation-selection process—variation and selection together—is filled with uncertainty". The level of uncertainty is affected by two things. First, "uncertainty comes from the degree of blindness in the variations". Uncertainty in the whole process decreases as technology matures—he notes that aircraft designers of today operate with more "sure-footedness" than the French of the early 1900s or even his era working at NACA. Yet, there is a paradox in decreasing blindness. While blindness decreases over time, advances simultaneously become more difficult to come by and more sophisticated ... which in turn, increases blindness! Thus the temptation to see a net decrease in blindesss "stems from an illusion". The variation-selection process can create as much blindness as it reduces; just ask "talented engineers who struggle to advance a mature technology like present-day aeronautics..."

The second factor on uncertainty in the whole variation-selection model is “unsureness” in the process of selection. Both vicarious and overt trials suffer from unsureness which adds complication to the variation selection model. But unlike blindness in variation, unsureness in selection decreases with the precision in both kinds of trials.

Blindness and unsureness characterize the difficult or arduous nature of technology evolution in the variation-selection model. The author then reviews the five case studies retrospectively to demonstrate how variation-selection and blindness-unsureness were at work in each case. In total, "the cumulative growth of engineering knowledge as the result of individual variation-selection processes acts to change the nature of how those processes are carried out."

== See also ==
- Engineering
- Airfoils
- Davis wing
- Control volume
- Propellers
- Flush rivets
