= Consolidated XP4Y Corregidor =

1939 prototype patrol flying boat model

XP4Y Corregidor
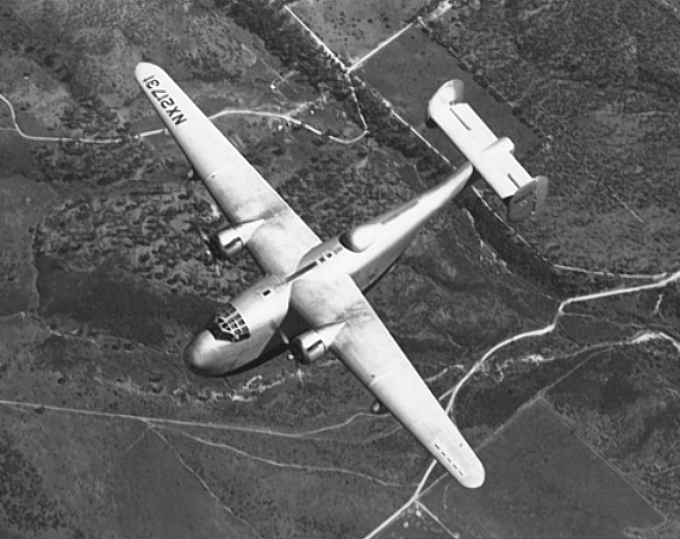

General information
- Type: Maritime patrol flying boat
- Manufacturer: Consolidated Aircraft
- Primary user: United States Navy
- Number built: 1

History
- First flight: 5 May 1939

The Consolidated XP4Y Corregidor (company Model 31) was an American twin-engined long-range maritime patrol flying boat built by Consolidated Aircraft for the United States Navy. Only one was built and a production order for 200 was cancelled.

== Design and development ==
The Model 31 was a new flying boat design started in 1938, intended for both military and commercial use. The aircraft was of all-metal construction with a high-mounted, high-aspect ratio cantilever monoplane wing (the Davis wing, which was later used in the B-24 Liberator) and an upswept aft fuselage with a tail unit with twin endplate fins and rudders. It had retractable floats on the undersides of the wings and was powered by two of the new Wright R-3350 radial engines. The civil version could carry seats for 52 passengers, or sleeper accommodation for 28.

The prototype Model 31 first flew on 5 May 1939, demonstrating excellent performance. The Japanese attack on Pearl Harbor on 7 December 1941 brought America into the Second World War just as testing was complete and the United States Navy purchased the prototype, designated XP4Y-1, which was converted into a prototype patrol aircraft, fitted with nose, tail and dorsal gun turrets and 4,000 lb (1,820 kg) of external stores.

A production order for 200 P4Y-1 was placed in October 1942, with a new aircraft plant which had been constructed at New Orleans, Louisiana to build the aircraft. Delays in preparation of the prototype and the shortage of Wright Duplex Cyclone engines (which were required to power the B-29 Superfortress) led to the production order being cancelled, with the factory being used to build the PBY, instead.

== Specifications (XP4Y-1) ==
Data from The Illustrated Encyclopedia of Aircraft (Part Work 1982–1985), 1985, Orbis Publishing, p. 1194

General characteristics

- Length: 74 ft 1 in (22.58 m)
- Wingspan: 110 ft 0 in (33.53 m)
- Height: 25 ft 2 in (7.67 m)
- Wing area: 1,048 sq ft (97.36 m^{2})
- Gross weight: 48,000 lb (21,772 kg)
- Powerplant: 2 × Wright R-3350-8 Cyclone 18 twin-row radial piston engine , 2,300 hp (1715 kW) each

Performance

- Maximum speed: 247 mph (398 km/h, 215 kn)
- Cruise speed: 136 mph (219 km/h, 118 kn)
- Range: 3,280 mi (5,279 km, 2,850 nmi)
- Service ceiling: 21,400 ft (6,520 m)
- Rate of climb: 1,230 ft/min (6.25 m/s)

Armament

- 1 x 37mm cannon in bow turret (proposed)
- 2 x 0.5in (12.7mm) machine-guns dorsal and tail (proposed)
- 4,000lb (1814kg) of external bombs or depth charges (proposed)

== See also ==
Related lists

- List of flying boats and floatplanes
