= Davis wing =

WWII era low-drag wing design

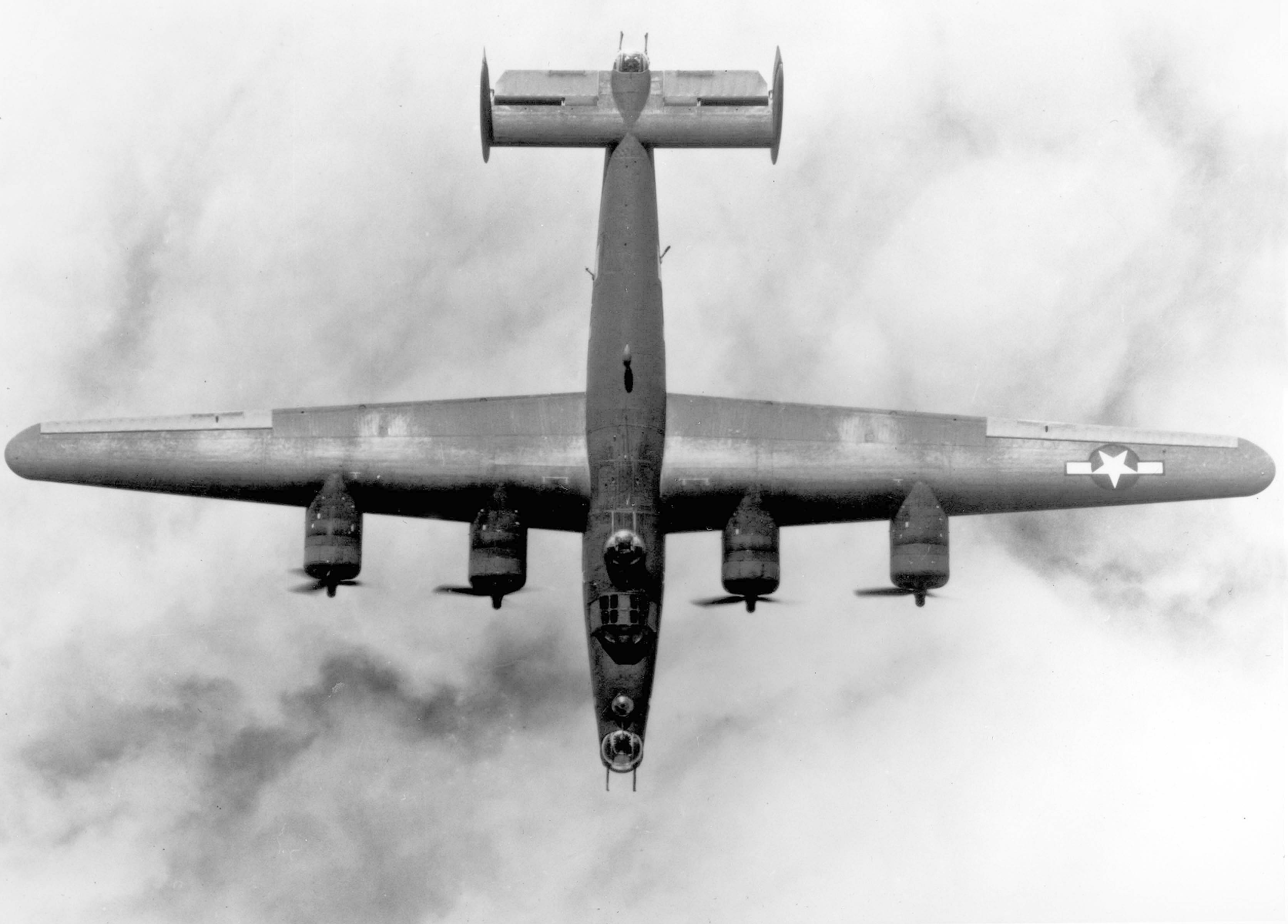
Planform view of a B-24 Liberator, showing the Davis wing design

The Davis wing is a World War II-era aircraft wing design that was used by Consolidated Aircraft on the Consolidated B-24 Liberator, as well as other models. The airfoil had a lower drag coefficient than most contemporary designs, which allowed higher speeds and created lift at relatively low angles of attack. Its use in designs ended almost immediately after World War II.

== Development and use ==
=== Theory and testing ===
In the summer of 1937, Reuben H. Fleet, president of Consolidated Aircraft met with David R. Davis, a freelance aeronautical engineer who was seeking funds to develop his airfoil design, the "Fluid Foil". Davis had designed the profile "in reverse", starting with a basic low-drag teardrop shape and then modifying it to provide lift. In comparison with conventional designs, Davis's design was relatively thick, having a short chord while still being deep enough to allow a high aspect ratio. Davis claimed the new wing would offer reduced drag over designs then in use, and would offer considerable lift even at a small angle of attack. The thick wing would also provide space for fuel storage, or even embedding engines, an idea that was in vogue at the time.

He approached Consolidated to license it for their large flying boats. The ability to generate lift at low angles of attack made it particularly attractive for flying boats because it would reduce the need to pull up the nose for takeoff and landing, which was limited in flying boats by the surface of the water. Neither Fleet nor Isaac M. Laddon, Consolidated's chief engineer, were impressed and Davis failed to convince them to try out his new design.

A few days later, however, Laddon changed his mind and convinced Fleet to pay for construction of a model and wing wind tunnel test at the California Institute of Technology. They intended to compare the design to one that had been designed in-house. Initial results of the Caltech wind tunnel tests were disappointing. Test instruments did not support Davis' predictions. However, Davis and others determined that the Caltech wind tunnel's instruments were not sufficiently sensitive to detect improvements from the Davis wing tests, despite being among the most sophisticated of their kind at the time. After re-calibration of the Caltech wind tunnel instruments, tests showed significantly improved readings.

The results of the wind tunnel test were so good that the engineers were skeptical. Caltech recalibrated its wind tunnel and ran them a second time, and then a third time. When it delivered its report to Consolidated it indicated that the wing appeared to deliver everything it claimed, but Caltech also suggested it might be a wind tunnel fluke, something that gives good results only in the tunnel. This is a common problem since the tunnel's walls affect the results by increasing the effective aspect ratio, or the Reynolds number used could have been incorrect.

=== Real world use ===
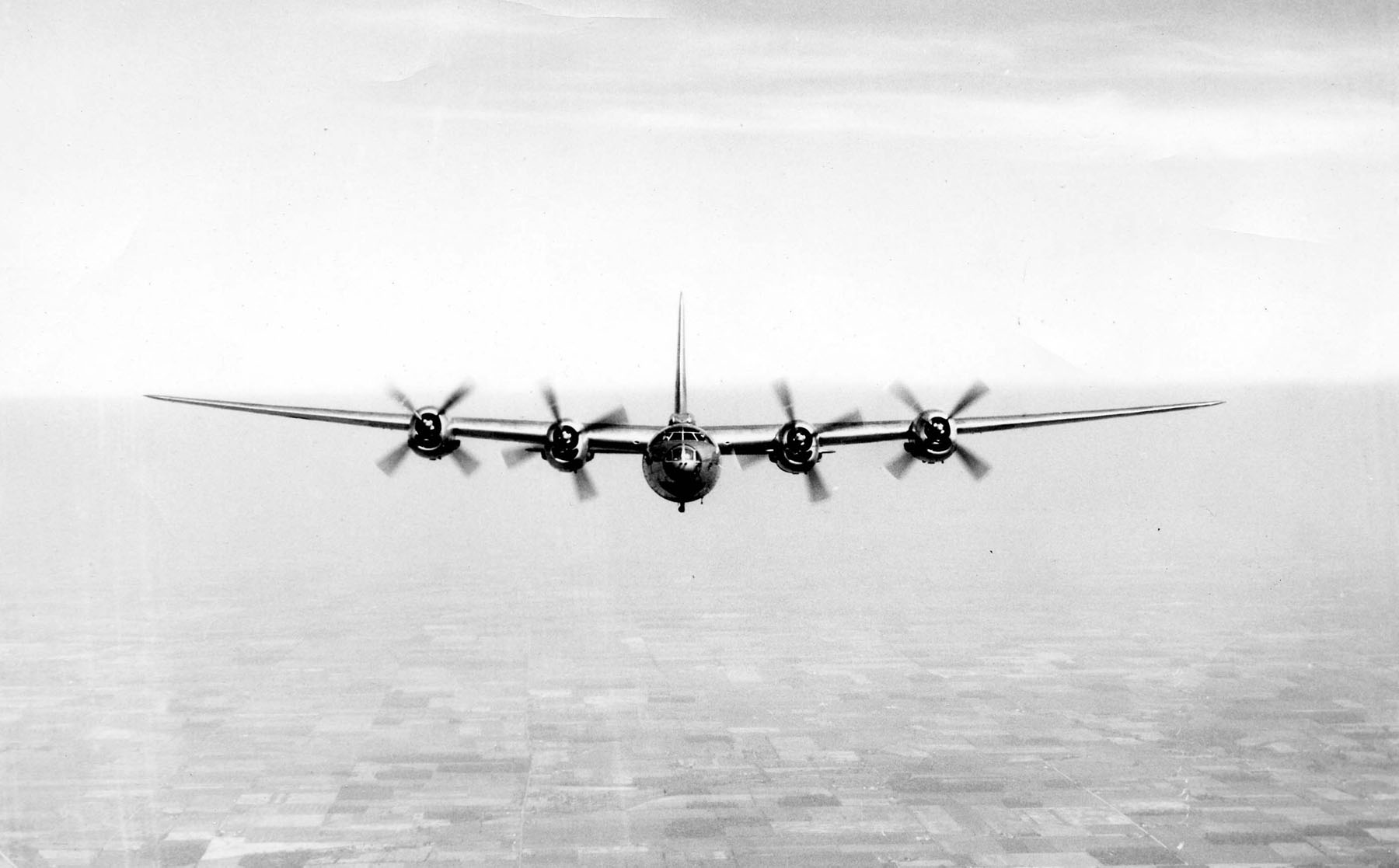
A B-32 Dominator in flight

Fleet allowed it to be used on Consolidated's new twin engine flying boat, the Model 31 XP4Y Corregidor. The Model 31 made its first flight on 5 May 1939, vindicating the Davis wing. By this point Consolidated was already working on a secret project for a new bomber to improve on the Boeing B-17 Flying Fortress that was just entering service, and had selected the Davis wing for this project as well. The Model 32, which would become the B-24 Liberator, first flew on 29 December 1939. The same basic wing would also be selected for the Consolidated B-32 Dominator. However, the wing was thinner than on the B-17 Flying Fortress and many Consolidated B-24 Liberator units suffered heavily, as the heavily loaded wings would often fail structurally when hit by gunfire. Because the wing was so high, a tricycle landing gear was used, though it made ditching the plane harder and complicated belly landings.

=== Limitations and abandonment ===
Only later was the reason for the Davis wing's performance properly understood. Largely through accident, the shape maintained laminar flow further back from its leading edge, to about 20 or 30% of chord compared to the 5 to 20% managed by most airfoil sections of the era. Although later designs greatly improved on this, with some maintaining laminar flow to upwards of 60% of chord, the Davis wing represented a great improvement at the time.

The thick profile of the wing quickly led to it being superseded. Although aerodynamic tests prior to the war had demonstrated that high-speed drag was strongly associated with thick wing profiles due to wave drag, it was only late in the war that higher speeds made that an insoluble problem. As speeds of aircraft increased, the Davis wing's reduced low-speed drag could not compensate for its increased high-speed drag.

== Bibliography ==
- The Davis Wing and the Problem of Airfoil Design, Walter G. Vincenti, Technology and Culture, Vol. 27, No. 4, Oct., 1986, pp. 717–758
- The Dreese Airfoil Primer, Part 5: Laminar Airfoils Made Easy
- Consolidated B-24 Liberator, The Aviation History Online Museum
