= Walter G. Vincenti =

American engineering scientist

- Born: Walter Guido Vincenti; April 20, 1917; Baltimore, Maryland, U.S.
- Died: October 11, 2019 (aged 102); Palo Alto, California, U.S.
- Education: Stanford University
- Partner: Joyce née Weaver
- Children: 2
- Scientific career
- Institutions: Ames Laboratory; United States Navy; Stanford University
- Notable students: Dale L. Compton

Walter Guido Vincenti (April 20, 1917 – October 11, 2019) was an American engineer who worked in the field of aeronautics, designing planes that could fly at hypersonic speed. He was elected as a member of several scientific societies, including the American Institute of Aeronautics and Astronautics and National Academy of Engineering. He won several prestigious awards, such as the Leonardo da Vinci Medal and the Daniel Guggenheim Medal.

== Early life and education ==
Walter Guido Vincenti was born on April 20, 1917, in Baltimore, Maryland, to parents Agnes and Guido Vincenti, emigrants from Italy. He was one of five children. His family later moved to Pasadena, California, which is where he grew up. His interest in airplanes began at age ten when, in 1927, Charles Lindbergh made a historic nonstop flight from New York City to Paris. He began constructing model aircraft afterwards.

Like his two elder brothers, he attended Stanford University for his undergraduate degree. He then completed two years of graduate work at Stanford in their mechanical engineering track with an emphasis in aeronautics.

== Career ==
Shortly before finishing his graduate degree, he accepted a job offer from Russell G. Robinson to work at the Ames Laboratory. During World War II, he and his colleagues were initially exempted from the draft due to their research on military-grade technology. The policy was changed partway through the war, and he was drafted into the Navy. His assignment at the Navy, however, was to stay at Ames Laboroatory and continue working on the development of a supersonic swept-wing design. He was made a chief petty officer.

He used the prize money from the Rockefeller Public Service Award to take a year-long sabbatical from Ames Laboratory and travel to Cambridge University. There, he studied the physics and chemistry of gases at high temperatures. When he returned to California in 1956, Stanford had decided to start a aeronautical engineering department within its School of Engineering; they offered Vincenti a professorship within the new department. The Soviet launch of Sputnik 1 the following year caused a massive influx of funding into the nascent department by the US government. Some of his accomplishments at Stanford include overseeing the construction of a hypersonic wind tunnel in 1965 and authoring Introduction to Physical Gas Dynamics (1965) and What Engineers Know and How They Know It: Analytical Studies from Aeronautical History (1990). From 1970–1976 he was a co-editor of the Annual Review of Fluid Mechanics.

== Awards and honors ==
In 1951 he was made a fellow of the American Institute of Aeronautics and Astronautics. He received a Rockefeller Public Service Award in 1956 for his work on heat shields for spacecraft re-entering the Earth's atmosphere. In recognition of his work teaching undergraduates, Stanford gave him the Lloyd W. Dinkelspiel Award in 1983. He was elected to the National Academy of Engineering in 1987. The Society for the History of Technology awarded him the Leonardo da Vinci Medal in 1998. In 2016 he was awarded the Daniel Guggenheim Medal for his career in the field of aeronautics. In 2019, he received the Stanford Engineering Heroes Award, which is the highest award given by the Stanford University School of Engineering.

== Personal life and death ==
He married Joyce née Weaver, a painter, in 1947. They had a son and daughter together. Vincenti died of pneumonia in Palo Alto, California on October 11, 2019. He was 102 years old.
