= Dirk Brouwer Award =

Dirk Brouwer Award may refer to:

- Brouwer Award (Division on Dynamical Astronomy), an award given annually by the Division on Dynamical Astronomy of the American Astronomical Society
- Dirk Brouwer Award (American Astronautical Society), an award given annually by the American Astronautical Society

== See also ==
- Dirk Brouwer
