= List of Georgia Institute of Technology faculty =

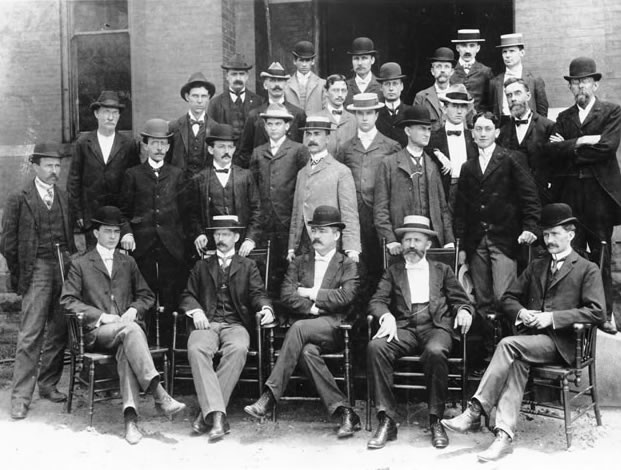
Georgia Tech faculty in 1899

This list of Georgia Institute of Technology faculty current and former faculty, staff and presidents of the Georgia Institute of Technology.

== Administration ==
=== Institute presidents ===
Name	Department	Notability	References
Ángel Cabrera	President: 2019–present		
George P. "Bud" Peterson	President: 2009–2019		
G. Wayne Clough	President: 1994–2008	the first alumnus to become president of Georgia Tech; separated the Ivan Allen College of Management, Policy, and International Affairs into the Ivan Allen College of Liberal Arts; returned the College of Management to "college" status	
John Patrick Crecine	President: 1987–1994	initiated the establishment of the College of Computing (the first computing college in the US), the Ivan Allen College of Management, Policy, and International Affairs, and the College of Sciences; served as chairman of the Georgia Tech Athletic Association and as president of the Georgia Tech Research Corporation; active member of the Atlanta Committee for the Olympic Games before and after Atlanta was chosen as host for the Centennial Games	
Joseph M. Pettit	President: 1972–1986		
Arthur G. Hansen	President: 1969–1971		
Edwin D. Harrison	President: 1957–1969	Racial integration began under his presidency.	
Blake R. Van Leer	President: 1944–1956	instrumental in making the school and Atlanta the first major research center in the American South	
Marion L. Brittain	President: 1922–1944	established the David Guggenheim School of Aeronautics; established the first ROTC unit in the Southern United States; got accreditation for the Institute by SACS; attributed with providing the vision and securing the finances to move Georgia Tech away from its roots as a teaching-oriented trade school and towards a new focus on science and technology	
Kenneth G. Matheson	President: 1906–1922	oversaw the school's transition from a trade school to a technological university; pioneered the bill that would eventually result in the establishment of the GTRI	
Lyman Hall	President: 1896–1905	noted for his aggressive fundraising and improvements to the school; opened the first textile engineering school in the Southern United States; established new degrees: electrical engineering, civil engineering, textile engineering, engineering chemistry; was an infamous disciplinarian, punishing the entire senior class because they came home a day late from Christmas vacation	
Isaac S. Hopkins	President: 1888–1896		

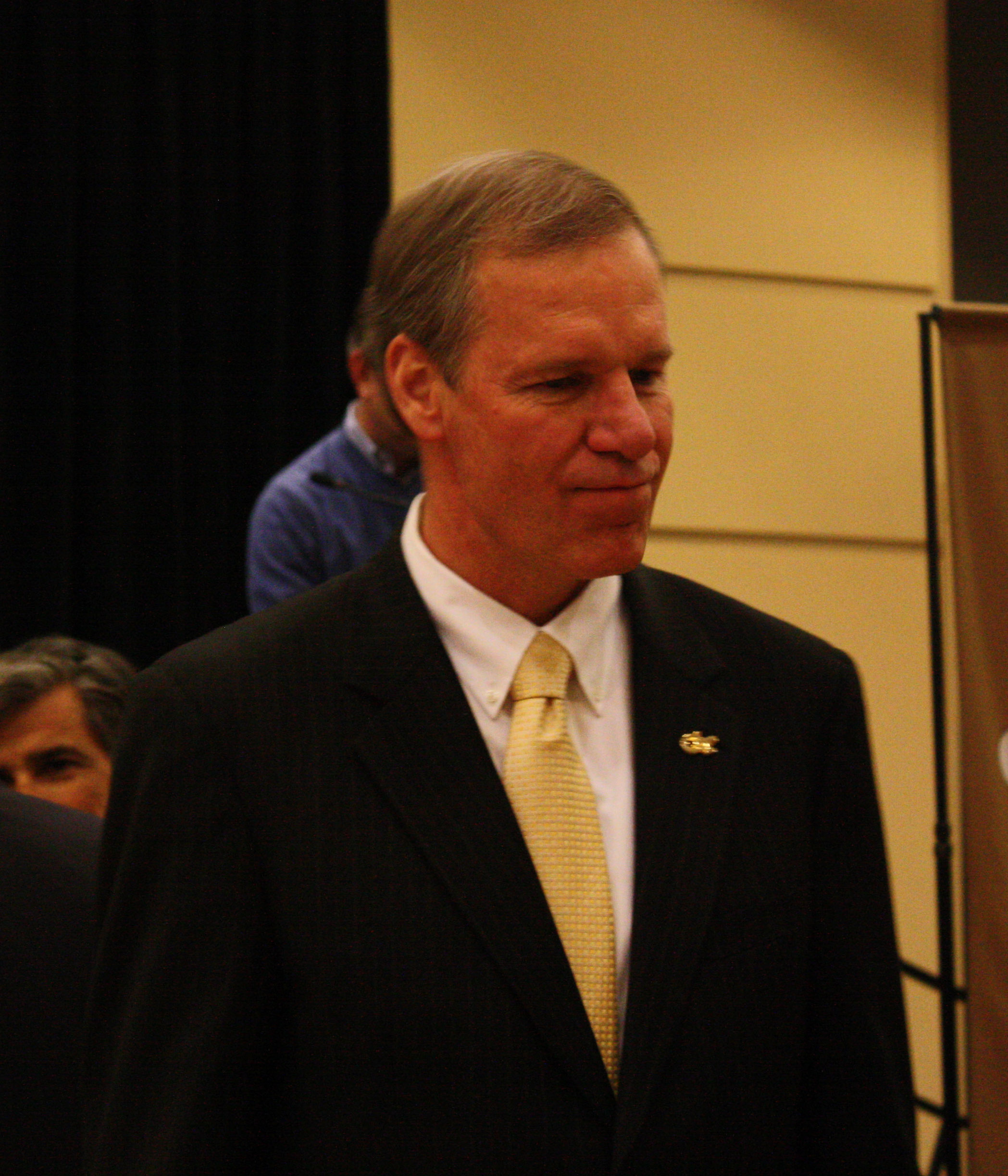
George P. "Bud" Peterson

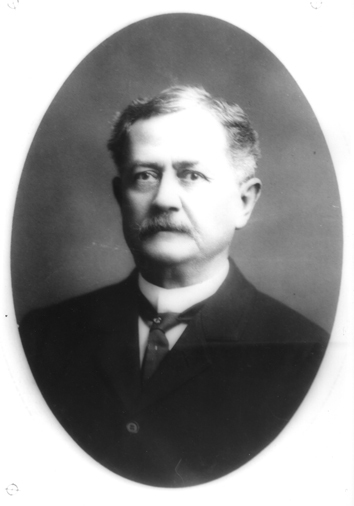
Isaac S. Hopkins

=== Other administration ===
Name	Department	Notability	References
Jean-Lou Chameau	Civil engineering	Georgia Tech's provost (2001–2006); president of California Institute of Technology (2006–present)	
Richard DeMillo	Computer Science	dean of the College of Computing (2003–2008); former director of the Georgia Tech Information Security Center	
Don Giddens	Aerospace engineering	dean of the College of Engineering (2007–2011)	
George C. Griffin	Civil engineering	dean of men (1946–1964); known as "Mr. Georgia Tech"	
Gary S. May	Electrical and Computer Engineering	dean of the College of Engineering (2011–present)	

=== Natural sciences ===
Name	Department	Notability	References
Jean-Luc Brédas	Chemistry	one of the top 100 most cited chemists in the world; awarded 1997 Francqui Prize on Exact Sciences; 2000 Quinquennial Prize of the Belgian National Science Foundation	
Edward M. Burgess	Chemistry	inventor of the Burgess reagent, secretary/treasurer of the Organic Division of the American Chemical Society	
Paul J. Crutzen	Chemistry	Nobel Prize-winning atmospheric chemist	
Predrag Cvitanović	Physics	researcher in nonlinear dynamics, especially periodic orbit theory	
David Finkelstein	Physics	(emeritus)	
Helen E. Grenga	Chemistry	Georgia Tech's first female professor	
Mostafa El-Sayed	Chemistry	director of Georgia Tech's Laser Dynamics Laboratory	
Turgay Uzer	Physics	researcher in nonlinear dynamics, especially applied to atomic and molecular systems	
Henry S Valk	Physics	(emeritus)	

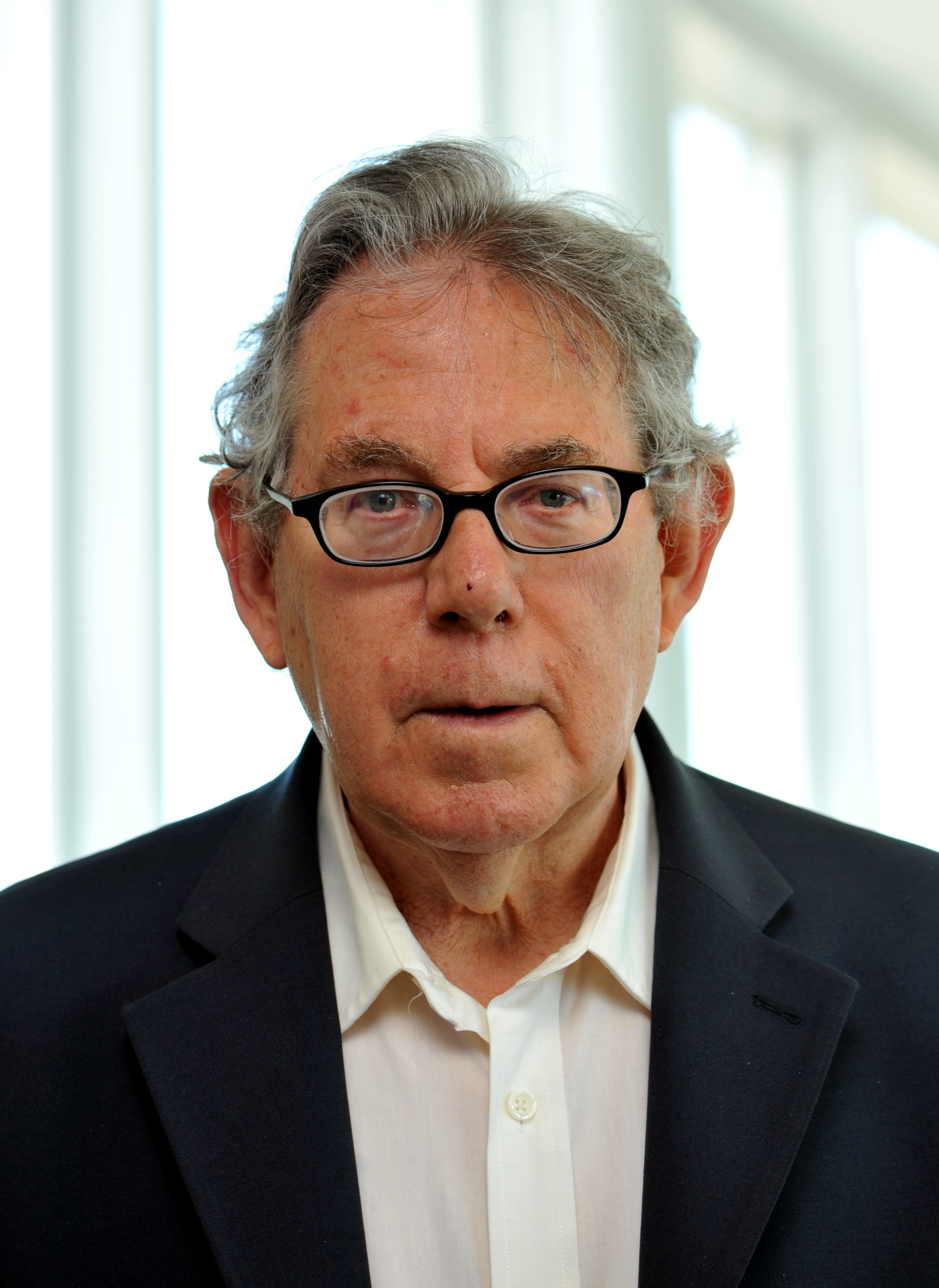
Paul J. Crutzen

=== Engineering ===
Name	Department	Notability	References
Nico F. Declercq	Mechanical Engineering	nondestructive testing, especially in acoustics, ultrasonics, and acousto-optics	
Russell Dupuis	Electrical and Computer Engineering	made pioneering contributions to metalorganic chemical vapor deposition (MOCVD) and continuous-wave room-temperature quantum-well lasers	
Magnus B. Egerstedt	Electrical and Computer Engineering	roboticist; major contributor to the theory of hybrid and discrete event systems, and in particular, the control of multi-agent systems; 2003 NSF CAREER Award recipient	
Bruce R. Ellingwood	Civil and Environmental Engineering	member of the National Academy of Engineering	
Wassim M. Haddad	Aerospace Engineering	IEEE Fellow; member of the Academy of Nonlinear Sciences; Presidential Faculty Fellow	
Ayanna M. Howard	Electrical and Computer Engineering	named one of the world's top young innovators of 2003 by the Technology Review journal	
Michael Massimino	Industrial and Systems Engineering	NASA astronaut; adjunct professor	
Gary S. May	Electrical and Computer Engineering	dean of College of Engineering	
James D. Meindl	Electrical and Computer Engineering		
Robert C. Michelson	Georgia Tech Research Institute & Aerospace Engineering	principal research engineer emeritus (GTRI) and adj. assoc. professor (AE); progenitor of the field of aerial robotics	
Panagiotis Tsiotras	Aerospace Engineering		
Ben Wang	Industrial Systems and Engineering	Gwaltney Chair in Manufacturing; executive director of the Georgia Tech Manufacturing Institute	
Ben Zinn	Aerospace Engineering	former international soccer player for both Israel and the United States; member of the National Academy of Engineering	

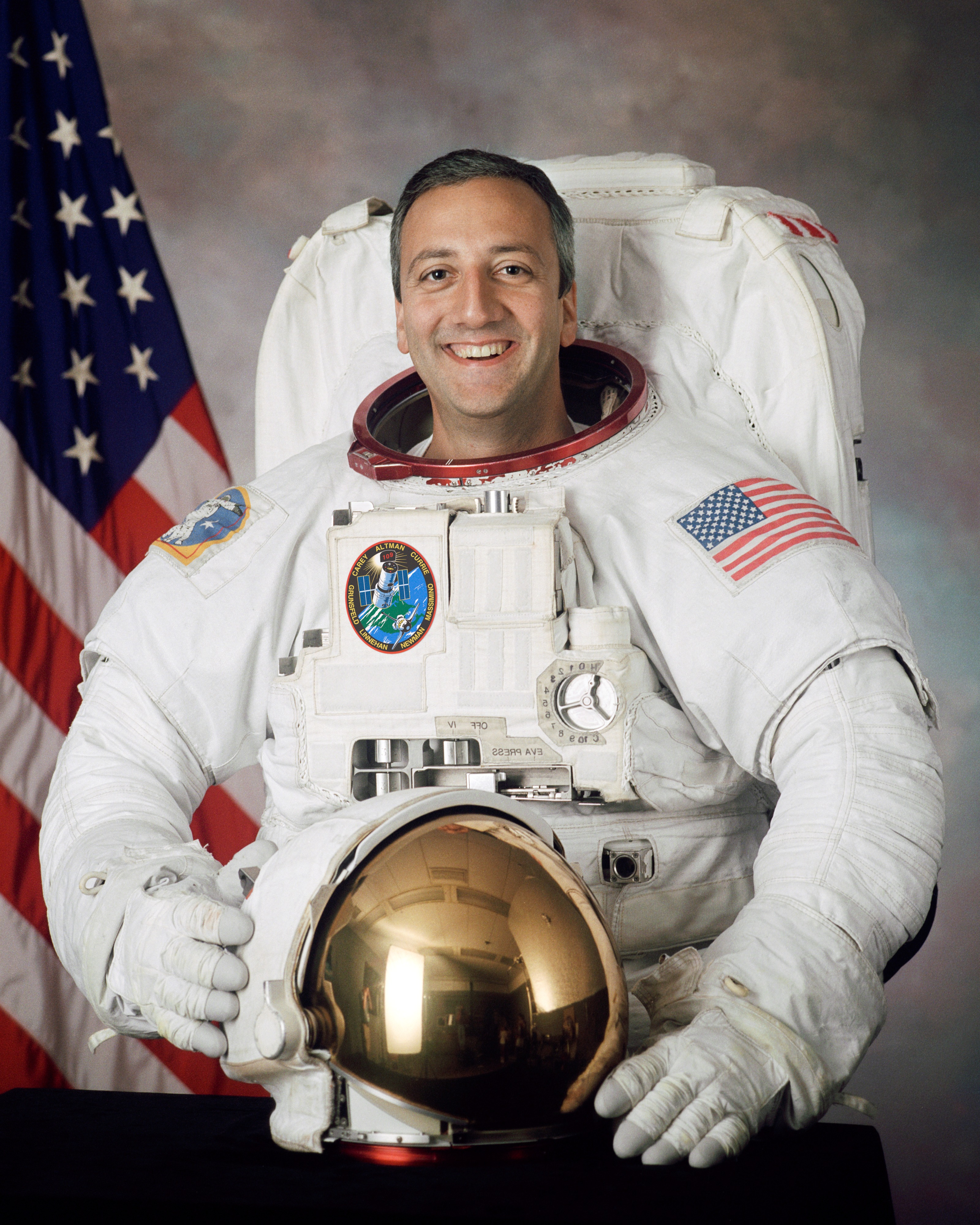
Michael Massimino

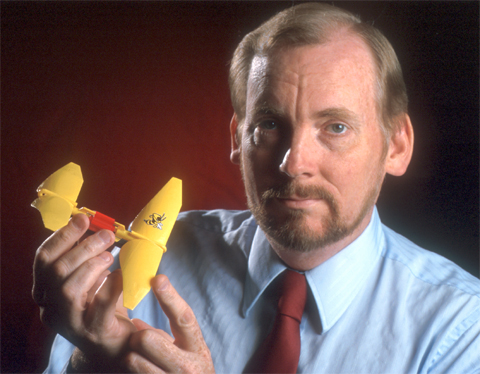
Robert C. Michelson

=== Computer science ===
Name	Department	Notability	References
Ronald C. Arkin	Computer Science	known for the motor schema technique in robot navigation; author of Behavior-Based Robotics	
David Bader	Computer Science	director of the first Sony Toshiba IBM Center of Competence for the Cell Processor at Georgia Tech; NSF CAREER Award recipient; IEEE Computer Society Distinguished Speaker; high-performance computing; expert in the design and analysis of parallel and multicore algorithms for real-world applications	
Aaron Bobick	Computer Science	known for contributions to robotics and computer vision; director of the GVU Center; in 2007 became the first chair of the new School of Interactive Computing	
Jay David Bolter	School of Literature, Communication, and Culture	studies the evolution of media and the usage of technology in education	
Amy S. Bruckman	School of Interactive Computing	designed several influential online communities and constructionist learning environments	
Tom Conte	Computer Science (joint with Electrical and Computer Engineering)	computer architect known for work in compiler code generation, fast computer architecture simulation and multicore architecture	
Frank Dellaert	Computer Science	affiliated with the RIM@GT center; known for contributions to robotics and computer vision	
James D. Foley	Computer Science	one of the fathers of modern computer graphics	
Nancy D. Griffeth	Computer Science		
Rebecca Grinter	School of Interactive Computing		
Mark J. Guzdial	Computer Science	original developer of the CoWeb (Swiki), one of the earliest wiki engines	
Janet L. Kolodner	Computer Science	case-based reasoning	
Richard J. Lipton	Computer Science	computer science theorist	
Nancy Lynch	Computer Science		
James H. McClellan	Computer Science		
Ralph Merkle	Computer Science		
Ashwin Ram	Computer Science		
Dana Randall	Computer Science		
Karsten Schwan	Computer Science	director of the Center for Experimental Research in Computer Systems at Georgia Tech	
Thad Starner	Computer Science	helped design Google Glasses based on his research	
Greg Turk	Computer Science		
Vijay Vazirani	Computer Science		
Ellen W. Zegura	Computer Science	founding chair of the School of Computer Science at the Georgia Institute of Technology College of Computing 2007–2012	

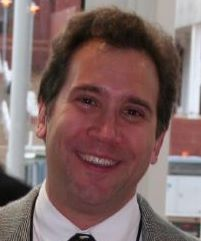
Mark Guzdial

=== Mathematics ===
Name	Department	Notability	References
Silas D. Alben	Mathematics	2005 Andreas Acrivos Dissertation Award (Fluid Dynamics) recipient; known for work in biomechanics and biologically inspired systems; member of the Center for Biologically Inspired Design	
Michael Barnsley	Mathematics	fractal compression	
Leonid Bunimovich	Mathematics	dynamical systems; discovered focusing chaotic billiards (the "Bunimovich stadium") and the Bunimovich mushroom	
Ernie Croot	Mathematics	proved the Erdős–Graham conjecture	
D. M. Smith	Mathematics		
Robin Thomas	Mathematics	graph theory; proved the strong perfect graph and other conjectures	

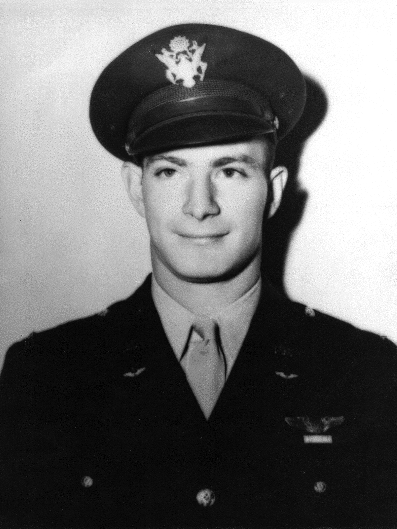
D. M. Smith

== Social sciences ==
=== Psychology ===
Name	Department	Notability	References
Jack M. Feldman	Psychology (COS)	industrial and organizational psychology	
Stanley A. Mulaik			

=== Public policy ===
Name	Department	Notability	References
Marilyn A. Brown	Public Policy	co-recipient of the 2007 Nobel Peace Prize	
Kaye Husbands Fealing	Public Policy	economics	
Mary Frank Fox	Public Policy	sociology	
Susan Herbst	Public Policy	communication theory and research	
Nancy J. Nersessian	Public Policy	philosophy	
John (J.P.) Walsh	Public Policy	sociology	

== Humanities ==
=== Literature ===
Name	Department	Notability	References
Jay David Bolter			
Janet Murray			

== Athletics ==
Name	Department	Notability	References
Bobby Cremins	Basketball	Georgia Tech basketball coach (1981–2000); College of Charleston basketball coach (2006–present); NCAA basketball analyst	
Bill Curry	Football	football head coach of Georgia Tech (1980–1986); football head coach of Alabama (1987–1989); football head coach of Kentucky (1990–1996); football head coach of Georgia State University (2008–present); NFL player (1963–1974)	
Bobby Dodd	Football	former Georgia Tech football coach; namesake of college football's Coach of the Year award and Georgia Tech's Bobby Dodd Stadium	
John Heisman	Football	former Georgia Tech football coach; namesake of the Heisman Trophy, college football's Outstanding Player of the Year award	

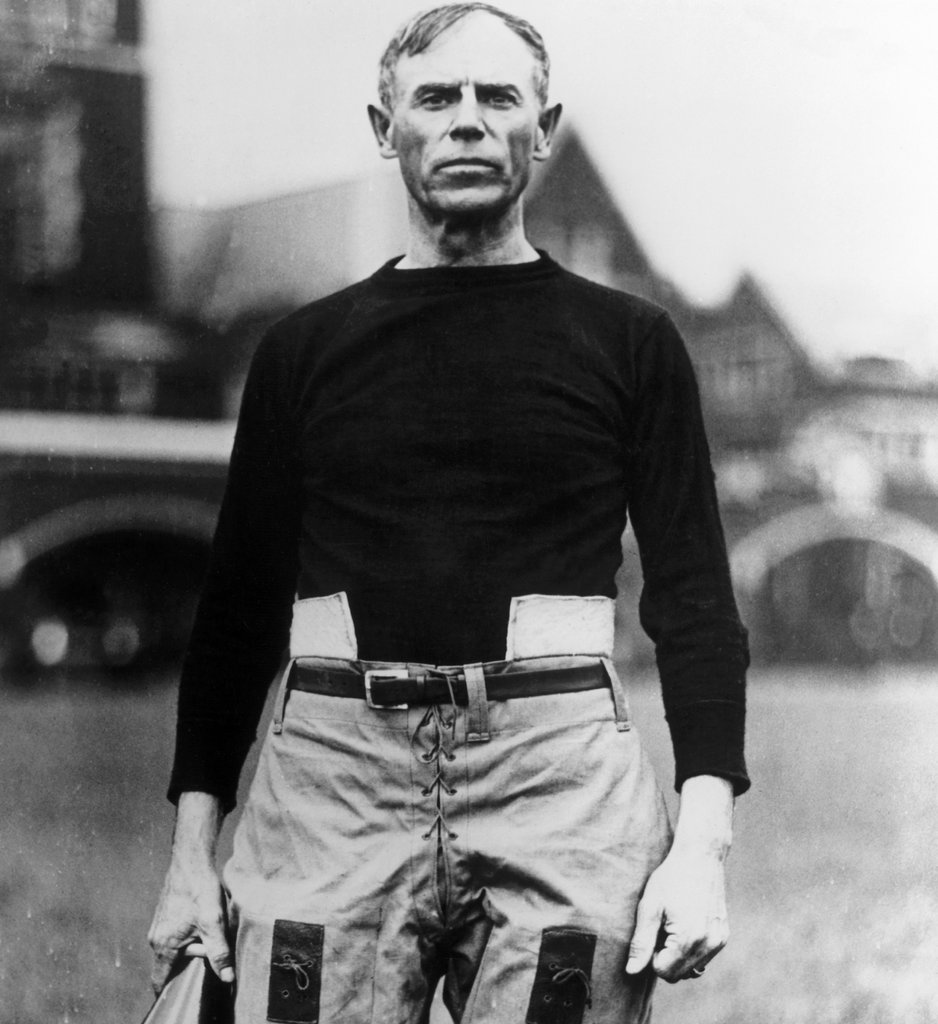
John Heisman
