= Jordi Puig-Suari =

Spanish-American aerospace engineer

Jordi Puig-Suari is a Spanish-American aerospace technology developer and retired professor. He is the co-inventor of the CubeSat standard together with Bob Twiggs, and the co-founder of Tyvak Nano-Satellite Systems.

== Early life and education ==
Puig-Suari was born in the Catalan region of Spain in 1965 to parents Josep Puig Mas and Leonor Suari Rojo. After moving to the United States, Puig-Suari obtained his BS and MS degrees from Purdue University School of Aeronautics and Astronautics, in 1988 and 1990, respectively. He then completed PhD dissertation at Purdue with Professor James Longuski as thesis advisor.

== Career ==
From 1994 to 1998, he was an assistant professor in mechanical and aerospace engineering at Arizona State University. Puig-Suari is a professor at Cal Poly, and served as chair of the Aerospace Engineering Department at Cal Poly from 2004 to 2008.

In 2011 Puig-Suari and Scott MacGillivray, former manager of nanosatellite programs for Boeing Phantom Works, established Tyvak Nano-Satellite Systems in San Luis Obispo, California, to sell miniature avionics packages for small satellites, with the goal to increase the volume available for payloads.

As of 2017, Puig-Suari had participated in 8 satellite development efforts and the launch of over 130 CubeSats worldwide.

In 2022, Puig-Suari was inducted into the Space Foundation's Space Technology Hall of Fame for his work developing and popularizing the CubeSat standard. That same year, Puig-Suari was also awarded the Creu de Sant Jordi, one of the highest civil distinctions awarded in Catalonia, by the Generalitat de Catalunya.

== See also ==
- Microsatellite
