= James Longuski =

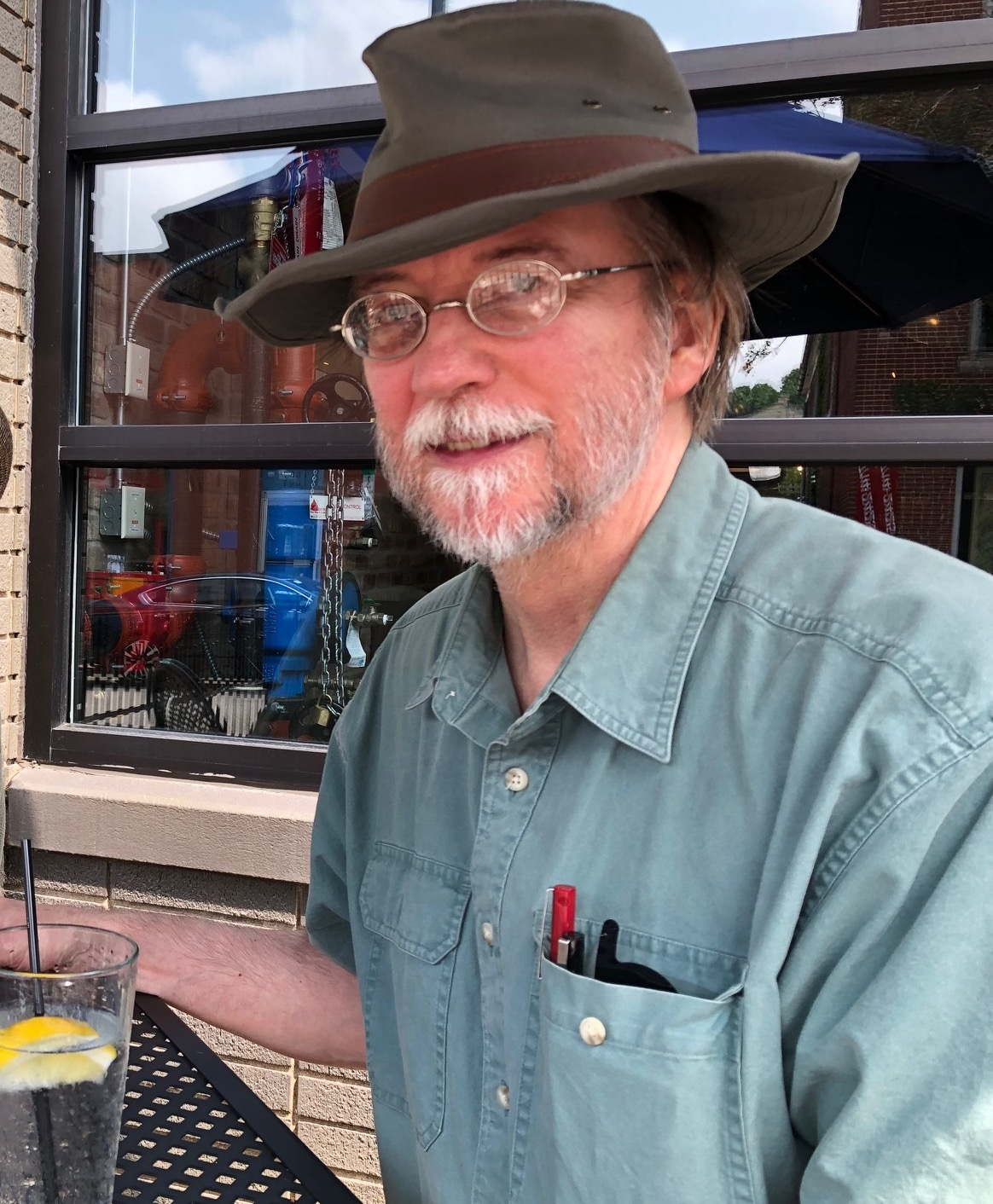
- James Longuski in 2018
- Born: James Michael Longuski; 1951 (age 74–75)
- Other names: Jim Longuski; JM Longuski
- Education: University of Michigan (BSE, MSE, PhD)
- Scientific career
- Workplaces: Purdue University; Purdue University School of Aeronautics and Astronautics
- Thesis: Analytic theory of orbit contraction and ballistic entry into planetary atmospheres (1979)
- Doctoral advisor: Nguyễn Xuân Vinh
- Doctoral students: Panagiotis Tsiotras
- Website: engineering.purdue.edu/AAE/people/ptProfile?resource_id=1319

James Michael Longuski (born 1951) is an American scientist, inventor, writer, and educator known for his contributions to astrodynamics and space mission design. He worked as a space mission designer at Jet Propulsion Laboratory (JPL) for NASA starting in 1979. Longuski joined the faculty at Purdue University School of Aeronautics and Astronautics in 1988 and served until after the fall semester 2023. After earning his Ph.D he worked at NASA at the jet propulsion laboratory (JPL) where he help the Galileo mission to Jupiter.

== Education ==
Longuski received his PhD in Aerospace Engineering from the University of Michigan in 1979 supervised by Nguyễn Xuân Vinh.

== Career and research ==
In the late 1990s together with Nathan Strange of JPL, he developed the method and coined the term, the “Tisserand graph,” widely used for gravity-assist spacecraft trajectory design (a concept independently introduced by Labunsky et al.). Longuski developed this mathematical method to help aid in complex gravity assist trajectories. Allowing for the calculation to go from months or years, to hours or even days. He also developed the technique and coined the term, “V-Infinity Leveraging,” which uses a deep space maneuver to leverage (increase or decrease) the hyperbolic velocity at the next gravity-assist body.

Longuski began work on Mars cycler trajectories in 1985 when Buzz Aldrin visited JPL looking for verification of his proposed trajectory now known as the Aldrin cycler. The concept involves placing a large spacecraft (or astronaut hotel) in orbit around the Sun that continually flies by Mars and Earth, providing a permanent human transportation system between those planets. Longuski was able to verify Aldrin's concept and together they developed several versions of cycler trajectories.

In 2001, Longuski with Ephraim Fischbach and Daniel Scheeres proposed a test of Albert Einstein's General Theory of Relativity based on spacecraft trajectories. Longuski is co-inventor with Dan Javorsek of a Method of Velocity Precision Pointing in Spin-Stabilized Spacecraft or Rockets.

=== Quotes ===
Any intelligent fool can make things bigger and more complex and more violent. It takes a touch of genius and a lot of courage to move in the opposite direction.

— James Longuski, The Seven Secrets of How to Think Like a Rocket Scientist

== Books ==
Longuski has published four books:

1. Advice to Rocket Scientists
2. The Seven Secrets of How to Think Like a Rocket Scientist
3. Optimal Control with Aerospace Applications
4. Introduction to Orbital Perturbations
