= Barbara Crawford Johnson =

American engineer

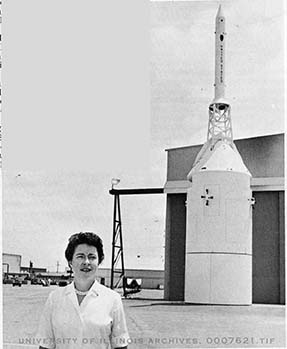
- At North American Aviation in 1963
- Born: Barbara Crawford; 1925; Sandoval, Illinois
- Died: 2005 (aged 79–80)
- Education: University of Illinois (1946 B.S. General Engineering)
- Occupation: Aerospace engineer
- Known for: Support of manned spaceflight programs
- Spouse: Robert H. Johnson
- Children: 1
- Engineering career
- Employer: North American Aviation (later a part of Rockwell International)
- Projects: Hound Dog, Navaho missile, Apollo program, Space Shuttle Program, Skylab
- Awards: Society of Women Engineers Achievement Award, Dirk Brouwer Award, American Astronautical Society

Barbara "Bobbie" Crawford Johnson (1925 - 2005) was an American aerospace engineer. She conducted significant and important studies on flight dynamics, missile design, wind tunnels, performance analysis, and aerodynamics.

== Early life and education ==
Barbara "Bobbie" Crawford was from the small town of Sandoval, Illinois, and grew up in a family of five children. Her father was a school superintendent, and her mother was a teacher. All five children were raised knowing they would attend college.

She had a fascination with flying, and was inspired Amelia Earhart. She was known to pass time by watching planes take off and land and interviewing pilots about how to fly planes.

As Johnson grew through her teenage years, she discovered her love for math and science. Her parents supported her aspirations to study engineering, and Johnson stated it was because she wasn't placed into a box due to her gender. "I didn't know that girls didn't take it," noted Johnson, referring to engineering. "My dad never said anything: he thought it was a great idea."

Financing college was a challenge for her family. Johnson ultimately enrolled at the University of Illinois in 1943 due to the availability of scholarships and her ability to qualify for low in-state tuition. There, she studied general engineering as the university did not yet offer an aeronautical engineering degree program.

In her free time while in college, Johnson was active in the Air Force Base in Rantoul, Illinois and eventually learned to fly on her own. She was also an at-large student senator.

In 1946, in just three years, Johnson became the first woman to earn a Bachelor's degree in general engineering from the University of Illinois. Upon graduation and with her love of flying, she decided to take a job with North American Aviation in California.

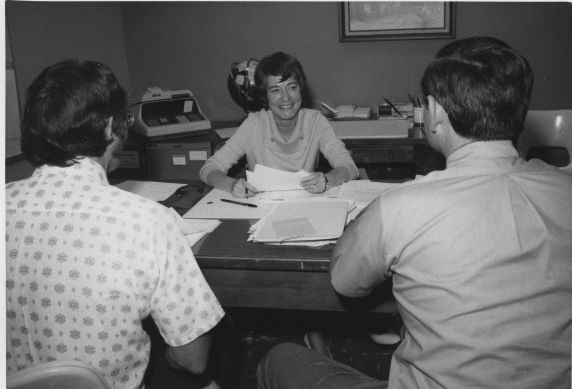
Johnson speaks to co-workers in her office, circa 1970–1974.

== Career ==
Johnson began her aerospace career in 1946 at North American Aviation (which later became the Space Division of Rockwell International) as a mathematician. She found the aviation calculations to be simple and tedious. Johnson requested an engineering assignment noting "I am an engineer, and I want a real engineer's job,". She was then reassigned to the supersonic inlet design for a ramjet. Within five years, she was promoted to senior engineer in aerodynamics (1953).

Johnson was the Project Lead for the Rockwell Hound Dog contract circa 1958. This air-to-ground missile was designed for nuclear warhead delivery. Johnson was involved from the first design concepts, through the final design selection for the Air Force. The project required periodic travel to brief defense officers at the Wright-Patterson Airforce Base. To bypass internal company restrictions for women traveling for work, Johnson made her airline reservations by using her initials. Her technical brief was a success. When she returned to the office, the internal restrictions for women traveling had been removed.

Johnson's assignments included work on flight dynamic projects including Dyna-Soar, the recovery of hypersonic gliders, lunar reentry vehicle research, and orbital rendezvous. She calculated the first boost trajectory ever calculated by hand on the Navaho missile project. Her efforts on the project evolved into her overseeing the entire aerodynamic performance.

In 1961, Johnson was the "Entry Trajectories" supervisor for the return of the Apollo missions. Johnson and her group initiated elliptical orbits, as opposed to circular orbits for the Apollo Lunar Landing Program.

In 1968, Johnson was the Systems Engineering Manager for "mission and flight operations for Command and Service Modules". She worked on the command service module for Skylab; the Apollo-Soyuz; and the Lunar Landing.

In 1972, Johnson was the Mission Analysis and Integration Manager for the Space Shuttle Program. She was responsible for the Space Shuttle Transportation System Orbiter vehicle, directing more than 100 engineers.

Johnson retired in 1981, after a 36-year career in the aerospace industry.

== Awards and memberships ==
Johnson was a 1978 Fellow of the Institute for the Advancement of Engineering, an Associate Fellow of the American Institute of Aeronautics and Astronautics. Johnson received several awards throughout her engineering career including:

- 1973 NASA Medallion commemorating the first Lunar Landing mission, Apollo 11.
- 1974: Society of Women Engineers Achievement Award “in recognition of her significant engineering contributions in support of manned spaceflight programs”
- 1974: The Gamma Epsilon Distinguished Alumni Merit Award, University of Illinois College of Engineering
- 1975: The Distinguished Alumni Award for "distinguished service in engineering", University of Illinois, College of Engineering
- 1976: Outstanding Engineering Merit Award for "contributions to Aeronautical Engineering" by the Institute for the Advancement of Engineering
- 1978 (1977?): Dirk Brouwer Award, American Astronautical Society

Johnson was elected 1989 Fellow of the Society of Women Engineers (SWE). She was an active member at the national level serving as the Achievement Awards Chair, the first chair of the new SWE Fellow Selection Committee, and a member of the SWE Nominating Committee.

She additionally received a Medallion of Honor Award in 1971 "in recognition of activities in her professional career as an engineer, her participation in the space program and the safe return of the astronauts, and her ability to combine the dual role of professional woman and homemaker" by the Mothers Association of the University of Illinois.

== Legacy ==
Johnson contributed significantly to the human spaceflight program in the U.S. She was the only woman on NASA's engineering team who participated in the Apollo landing on the Moon. In 1968, she was appointed to the highest position ever achieved by a woman in her department: manager of the Apollo Program.

She was the first woman to graduate from the University of Illinois’ General Engineering Program, and the first woman awarded the Distinguished Alumni Award from the University of Illinois.

== Personal life ==
She married Robert H. Johnson in 1956. He was also in the aerospace industry at Rockwell. They had one son.

== Additional reading ==
Craig, Cecilia (2025). Chapter 29 "Barbara Crawford Johnson". In Craig, Cecilia; Teig, Holly; Kimberling, Debra; Williams, Janet; Tietjen, Jill; Johnson, Vicki (eds.). Women Engineering Legends 1952-1976: Society of Women Engineers Achievement Award Recipients. Springer Cham. ISBN 978-3-032-00223-5
