= Gerstenmaier =

Gerstenmaier is a German surname. Notable people with the surname include:

- Eugen Gerstenmaier (1906–1986), German theologian, resistance fighter and politician
- William H. Gerstenmaier (born 1954), American NASA administrator
