= List of Psi Upsilon chapters =

Psi Upsilon is a North American fraternity, founded at Union College on November 24, 1833. In the following list of Psi Upsilon chapters, active chapters are indicated in bold and inactive chapters and institutions are in italics.

Chapter	Charter date and range	Institution	Location	Gender	Status	Ref.
Theta	November 24, 1833 – 2009; 20xx ?–2014	Union College	Schenectady, New York	Male	Inactive	
**Delta**	February 11, 1837 – 1989; 1992–2003; 2010	New York University	New York City, New York	Coed	Active	
Beta (Fence Club)	August 9, 1839 – 1934	Yale University	New Haven, Connecticut	Male	Inactive	(Note: The oldest traditional fraternities (~junior societies) at Yale named their buildings with "Hall" nicknames, by which they wished to be known on campus: Thus Psi Upsilon became the Fence Club. Similarly, Phi Gamma Delta was Vernon Hall which later became Myth and Sword. Sigma Delta Chi (local) was renamed the Cloister Club which soon became Book and Snake. Theta Xi's chapter was Franklin Hall, Phi Sigma Kappa adopted the name Sachem Hall, and Delta Psi adopted the name St. Anthony Hall which spread to their entire small national fraternity. Chi Delta Theta (local literary honorary) established the Manuscript Society, Chi Phi was York Hall, and finally, Delta Phi was known at Yale as St. Elmo's.)
Sigma	March 28, 1840 – 1965; 1985–1993	Brown University	Providence, Rhode Island	Male	Inactive	
Gamma	November 16, 1841 – 2010	Amherst College	Amherst, Massachusetts	Male	Inactive	
**Zeta**	May 10, 1842	Dartmouth College	Hanover, New Hampshire	Male	Active	
Lambda	June 10, 1842 – 2014	Columbia University	New York City, New York	Male	Inactive	
Kappa	July 26, 1843 – 1998	Bowdoin College	Brunswick, Maine	Coed	Inactive	
**Psi**	September 25, 1843	Hamilton College	Kirkland, New York	Male	Active	(Note: Chapter formed from Iota Tau, established in 1842.)
**Xi**	November 20, 1843	Wesleyan University	Middletown, Connecticut	Coed	Active	(Note: Chapter formed from Kappa Sigma Theta, established in 1840.)
Alpha	November 22, 1850 – 1873	Harvard University	Cambridge, Massachusetts	Male	Inactive	
**Upsilon**	February 15, 1858 – 2010, 2013	University of Rochester	Rochester, New York	Male	Active	(Note: Chapter formed from the Innominata Society, established in 1853.) (Note: In 2010, the university suspended the chapter for three years for underage drinking and hazing.)
Iota	November 24, 1860 – 2010	Kenyon College	Gambier, Ohio	Male	Inactive	
**Phi**	January 26, 1865 – 2013 ; 2018	University of Michigan	Ann Arbor, Michigan	Male	Active	(Note: Chapter formed from Beta Theta Pi, established in 1845.)
Omega (First)	April 17, 1869 – 1886	Old University of Chicago	Chicago, Illinois	Male	Reassigned	(Note: Chapter went inactive when the college closed.)
**Pi**	June 8, 1875	Syracuse University	Syracuse, New York	Male	Active	(Note: Chapter formed from Upsilon Kappa, established in 1863.)
Chi	June 12, 1876 – 2016	Cornell University	Ithaca, New York	Male	Inactive	(Note: Chapter formed from Phi Kappa Psi, established in 1869.) (Note: The university suspended the chapter for three years for violating university policy.)
**Beta Beta**	February 4, 1880	Trinity College	Hartford, Connecticut	Male	Active	(Note: Chapter formed from Beta Beta, established in 1842.)
**Eta**	February 22, 1884	Lehigh University	Bethlehem, Pennsylvania	Male	Active	(Note: Chapter formed from Phi Theta Psi, established in 1882.)
**Tau (Castle)**	May 5, 1891 – 1990; 2000	University of Pennsylvania	Philadelphia, Pennsylvania	Male	Active	(Note: Chapter formed from Upsilon Kappa, established in 1887.)
Mu	May 22, 1891 – 1993	University of Minnesota	Minneapolis, Minnesota	Male	Inactive	(Note: Chapter formed from Theta Phi (local), established in 1879.)
Rho	March 27, 1896 – 1971; 1978–1987; 2012–2021	University of Wisconsin–Madison	Madison, Wisconsin	Male	Inactive	(Note: Chapter formed from Phi Kappa Psi, established in 1875.) (Note: Chapter was suspended.)
**Omega**	November 24, 1897	University of Chicago	Chicago, Illinois	Male	Active	(Note: Chapter formed from the Omega Society, established in 1894.)
Epsilon	August 18, 1902 – 1972; 1986–1998	University of California, Berkeley	Berkeley, California	Male	Inactive	(Note: Chapter formed from Alpha Psi, established in 1898.)
Omicron	May 28, 1910 – 2026	University of Illinois Urbana-Champaign	Champaign, Illinois	Male	Inactive	(Note: Chapter formed from the Aztec Club, established in 1904.)
Delta Delta	May 7, 1913 – 1968	Williams College	Williamstown, Massachusetts	Male	Inactive	(Note: Chapter formed from Delta Delta, established in 1911.)
**Theta Theta**	June 10, 1916	University of Washington	Seattle, Washington	Male	Active	(Note: Chapter formed from Phi Kappa, established in 1909.)
Nu	1920–1973, 1980–1997	University of Toronto	Toronto, Ontario, Canada	Male	Inactive	(Note: Chapter formed from Chi Delta Psi, established in 1900.)
Epsilon Phi	1928–1971; 1979–1997	McGill University	Montreal, Quebec, Canada	Male	Inactive	(Note: Chapter formed from Epsilon Phi, established in 1904.)
**Zeta Zeta**	1935	University of British Columbia	Vancouver, British Columbia, Canada	Male	Active	(Note: Chapter formed from Alpha Kappa Alpha, established in 1926.)
**Epsilon Nu**	1943	Michigan State University	East Lansing, Michigan	Male	Active	(Note: Chapter formed from Hesperian, established in 1889.)
Epsilon Omega	1949–1999	Northwestern University	Evanston, Illinois	Male	Inactive	(Note: Chapter formed from Diamond Club, established in 1947.)
Theta Epsilon	1952–1962	University of Southern California	Los Angeles, California	Male	Inactive	(Note: Chapter formed from Sterx Club, established in 1949.)
Nu Alpha	1970–1974	Washington and Lee University	Lexington, Virginia	Male	Inactive	(Note: Chapter formed from Phi Epsilon Pi, established in 1920.)
**Gamma Tau**	1970	Georgia Tech	Atlanta, Georgia	Coed	Active	
**Chi Delta**	1973	Duke University	Durham, North Carolina	Coed	Active	(Note: Chapter formed from Chi Delta Phi, established in 1968.)
Zeta Tau	1981–1992	Tufts University	Medford, Massachusetts	Male	Inactive	
**Epsilon Iota**	1982	Rensselaer Polytechnic Institute	Troy, New York	Coed	Active	(Note: Chapter formed from Tau Epsilon Phi, established in 1957.)
**Phi Beta**	1984–2006, 2020	College of William & Mary	Williamsburg, Virginia	Male	Active	
Kappa Phi	1989–1998	Pennsylvania State University	State College, Pennsylvania	Male	Inactive	(Note: Chapter formed from Delta Kappa Phi, established in 1974.)
Beta Kappa	1991–2023	Washington State University	Pullman, Washington	Male	Inactive	
Beta Alpha	1992–1995	Miami University	Oxford, Ohio	Male	Inactive	
**Phi Delta**	1996	University of Mary Washington	Fredericksburg, Virginia	Male	Active	
**Lambda Sigma**	1998	Pepperdine University	Los Angeles County, California	Male	Active	(Note: Chapter formed from Lambda Omega Sigma, established in 1983.)
**Alpha Omicron**	1999	New Jersey Institute of Technology	Newark, New Jersey	Male	Active	(Note: Chapter formed from Eta Nu Lambda, established in 1995.)
**Sigma Phi**	2007	Saint Francis University	Loretto, Pennsylvania	Male	Active	(Note: Chapter formed from Sigma Phi, established in 2005.)
Delta Nu	2009–2020	Keene State College	Keene, New Hampshire	Coed	Inactive	
Phi Nu	2010–2023	Christopher Newport University	Newport News, Virginia	Male	Active	(Note: Chapter formed from Delta Nu Psi, established in 1987. It was suspended for hazing until 2025.)
San Diego State Provisional	2013–2015	San Diego State University	San Diego, California	Male	Inactive	
Theta Pi	2014–2015	Georgia State University	Atlanta, Georgia	Coed	Inactive	
**Tau Epsilon**	2018	Clemson University	Clemson, South Carolina	Male	Active	
**Delta Omicron**		Purdue University	West Lafayette, Indiana	Coed	Active	
