= Permanence (novel) =

2002 novel by Karl Schroeder

- First edition
- Author: Karl Schroeder
- Cover artist: Alan Pollack
- Language: English
- Genre: Science fiction
- Publisher: Tor Books
- Publication date: 2002
- Publication place: Canada
- Media type: Print
- Pages: 447
- ISBN: 0-7653-0371-X
- OCLC: 48655797

Permanence is a 2002 science fiction novel by Canadian writer Karl Schroeder.

== Plot ==
The novel tells the story of two characters, Rue Cassels and Michael Bequith, and their encounter with an alien spacecraft Rue has named Jentry's Envy. Schroeder uses the story as a venue for discussing the information economy and philosophy.

Rue, on the run from her brother Jentry and out of money, files claim on an undiscovered comet. She expects to profit from the mineral rights, but it turns out that the "comet" is actually an interstellar cycler, a ship that travels in a light-years length orbit, at relativistic speeds (85% c) carrying cargo and passengers between the Halo Worlds, planets that orbit brown dwarf stars. The discovery causes a sensation, since the ship is the first to approach the planet Erythrion in ten years. Eventually her claim is upheld, since the cycler is silent, and her mineral rights become salvage rights, making her potentially very wealthy. A rich cousin of hers, Max Cassels, sponsors an expedition to the ship so she can claim it. Intrigue happens on the trip as several factions also want to claim it, such as the planetary government. The cyclers were the centerpiece of the Cycler Compact, but have slowly fallen out of use since the discovery of FTL travel, only possible between "lit" worlds. When they reach the ship, they are surprised to discover that it is an alien cycler, an unknown because all known aliens use FTL ships. They explore the ship some and jump off as it passes a lit world, Chandaka.

Michael Bequith, a NeoShinto monk and aide to Dr. Laurent Herat, an exobiologist, are commandeered by Rear Admiral Crisler of the Rights Economy to join a joint expedition back to the Envy. The RE is interested, because the Envy appears to be a multi-species vessel, something previously unheard of. They are also interested because writing on the craft is the script of an alien species, the Lasa, who have supposedly been extinct for the last two billion years. Rue and her crew are also returning, since under Compact law she can only complete her claim if she can control the Envy.

Before they can leave, the city suffers a rebel attack and one of their party, Dr Linda Ophir, is murdered. They travel in a ramscoop ship, the Banshee.

When they arrive, they explore various areas of the ship before an explosion damages life support on the Banshee. Michael discovers that Dr. Ophir was murdered because she had discovered pictures of the writing on the Envy had been tampered with. Eventually they discover that part of the Envy is designed as a test to ascertain living conditions for visitors. Rue completes the process and the cycler builds them a new module and a set of controls.

The expedition leaves the Envy for Oculus, a Halo world. Rue, now a Cycler Captain by law, is caught up in Compact politics over the course of the Envy. Michael and Dr. Herat arrange with representative of the alien Autotrophs to translate the writing on the Envy. The translation has grave consequences since it implies that the weapon of the Chicxulub, an ancient race that sent out waves of self-replicating machines to wipe out potential competitors, has survived. They realize that Crisler wants to use the weapon to wipe out the rebels.

Rue learns from Max that Mallory, a Halo Worlder, wants to dissolve the Compact and join the RE. Rue goes to meet her crew to prepare to leave, but they are ambushed by Crisler and Max is killed. Rue, Michael, Dr Herat and Barents (a Rebel) escape in a submarine, but the attackers destroy the control computer just as they dive. They continue to do so for some hours, eventually getting caught by a cold current. They wind up at a secret undersea research base, where they are rescued by military police.

They learn that Rue was believed dead along with her cousin and Crisler and Mallory have already departed for the Envy, having learned its point of origin, Apophis and Osiris, planetless binary brown dwarfs. They expect that he will arrive in sixteen months. The government has a secret way that will get them there, but only for citizens of the Compact.

Dr. Herat elects to become a citizen of the compact, but Michael abstains. Michael passes preparation time for the trip by exploring abandoned ice tunnels on the planet with Barents. They discover that the Autotroph plans to leave the planet and warn its race about the weapon. Michael convinces them to let humans handle it. A message from a loyal member of the Envy's crew arrives, stating that Crisler is planning a dangerous maneuver that will cut three months off his travel time. Rue takes drastic measures and shanghais Michael on the voyage, a new technology that allows a fleet of 15 small interceptor ships to enter FTL from inside the atmosphere of a brown dwarf.

They arrive safely at the Twins (except for one ship) and discover that the Twins are ringed with power tethers that allow resources and power to be extracted. In the orbital center of the system is the construction shack that created the Envy. Her fleet is briefly attacked by the system's defenses, but she learns how to camouflage her ships. The Banshee was less successful and suffered a major hull breach.

Rue and the soldiers sneak into the Banshee and free some of her original crew. The rest are in the construction shack, being used as explorers by Crisler. They leave for the construction shack, stealing an antimatter generator to use as cover. They enter the shack by way of burning a hole in the hull. Inside, Michael's team and Crisler's men are engaged in a firefight (literally, as the inside atmosphere is a hydrogen/oxygen mix). Michael shoots out a magnet block controlling the airlock and Crisler's marines are sucked out into space.

However, Crisler soon recaptures them. He reveals that the shack is not the true treasure, but the cycler mother seeds, one of which can regrow a complete cycler construction system. He plans to reverse engineer the technology and use it to wipe out the rebels and their worlds. Since the ships would be unable to distinguish between Rebel and alien worlds, this would amount to genocide on a universal scale. They also discover that the shack was not built by Lasa, but renegade Chicxulub, who embraced the Lasa philosophy.

Crisler's new cycler finishes and the shack launches it. Rue and company escape from Crisler by cutting loose a habitat. Barendts leaves with the seed and Michael pursues him. Rue leaves the habitat to get one of the interceptors and meets Michael, returning with the seed.

Later, Rue and her crew watch as Crisler's cycler is launched from the system. The power tethers have redirected power back into one of the dwarfs to create a massive flare to use as an energy beam.

On Erythrion, Rue announces her plan to revitalize the Cycler Compact, since the Lasa/Chicxulub technology means that the Halo worlds will at last be able to launch their own cyclers.

Rue, however, is already planning her voyage to New Armstrong to reclaim the Envy and capture Crisler and Mallory.

== Information economy ==
In the "rights economy", all physical objects are nano-tagged so that payment may be enforced for all uses of proprietary information. The result is a totalitarian dystopia. Schroeder assumes solutions to the problems of conducting trade in space conducted almost entirely through intangible goods—some form of interstellar money (Pp. 86, 321)—without explaining the underlying problem of creating such a currency or how the solution was devised.

== Supreme Meme ==
Schroeder recycles Friedrich Nietzsche's myth of the eternal return to critique all organized religion with a plot device he describes as the Supreme Meme. The philosophic question asked is whether or not the subject would choose to relive the same life over again "exactly as it was, no detail spared?" (pp. 232–233).

== Interstellar cycler ==
In Permanence, Schroeder envisions an interstellar cycler, a vehicle that would never slow down, instead using Lorentz force turning to curve its trajectory in a circle, an idea considered by P.C. Norem in a 1969 paper. The idea is that the life support for an interstellar vehicle wouldn't have to be accelerated, only the payload, allowing more to be carried for a given energy budget.

== Literary significance and reception ==
Roberta Johnson in her review for Booklist said "by turns exciting and thoughtful, pitiless and romantic, Schroeder's excellent novel is the best kind of coming-of-age novel, one that seizes the imagination and the emotions." Booklist praised the novel saying "once again, the plot—of which the foregoing is barely a hint—arises organically from the backdrop and characters: thoughtful, well-informed, insightful work, with a sharp yet subtle political subcontext, catapulting Schroeder into SF's front rank." The Library Journal said "the author of Ventus showcases his gift for panoramic storytelling in this story of a young woman's struggle to find her place in a world where trust and friendship are rare treasures." Christine C. Menefee in her review for School Library Journal said "this suspenseful, complex tale asks many intriguing questions and illustrates more scientific principles than a semester of science labs. Some readers might not quite follow all of the rapid twists and turns, but they will want to hang on to reach the story's satisfying conclusion, where a thoughtful solution emerges amid plenty of fireworks."

== See also ==
- Lunar cycler
- Mars cycler

== Reviews ==
- James Schellenberg
- , by Jo Walton
