= Sergey Macheret =

American physicist and aerospace engineer

- Born: Sergey Olegovich Macheret; December 25, 1957
- Scientific career
- Fields: plasma physics, plasma chemistry, aeronautics
- Institutions: Kurchatov Institute, Princeton University, Lockheed Martin Skunk Works, Purdue University
- Doctoral advisor: Alexander A. Fridman

Sergey O. Macheret (born December 25, 1957) is an American physicist and aerospace engineer known for his contributions to plasma science and engineering. Macheret formulas for endothermic exchange reactions and Macheret-Fridman model of vibration-dissociation coupling are used for analysis of hypersonic and other chemically reacting flows.

== Education and career ==
Macheret received his PhD degree from Kurchatov Institute in 1985. He worked at the Ohio State University, Princeton University, and Lockheed Martin Aeronautics Company. He was a professor at Purdue University School of Aeronautics and Astronautics in 2014-2024.

He was elected as a fellow of the American Institute of Aeronautics and Astronautics (AIAA) and received the AIAA Plasmadynamics and Lasers Award in 2022.

=== Macheret formulas ===
The formulas are used for estimation of non-equilibrium rate coefficients of the simple-exchange endothermic reaction: $XY(v)+Z \rightarrow X+YZ$. Such reactions appear in low-temperature nonequilibrium plasmas where substantial fraction of energy input goes into vibrational excitation of molecules. The formulas are obtained by applying classical mechanics methods for high temperatures and semi-classical approximation for moderate temperatures.

Assumptions:

1. Translational-vibrational non equilibrium: $T>T_v$ or $T<T_v$.

2. Collisions are collinear and rotational energy effects are negligible.

3. The duration of collision is much faster than the period of molecule vibration.

4. The vibrational energy obeys Boltzmann distribution.

Formulas and relations:

$$k(T,T_v)=Z(T,T_v) k^0(T)$$

Nonequilibrium factor in the high temperature case ($T \geq \theta$):

$$Z(T,T_v)=\exp\left[ -\frac{E_a-W}{\alpha_M T_v + (1-\alpha_M)T} - \frac{W}{T}+\frac{E_a}{T}\right]$$

$$\alpha_M=\frac{m_Y(m_X+m_Y+m_Z)}{(m_X+m_Y)(m_Y+m_Z)}$$

$$W=E_a(1-\frac{f_v}{\alpha_M})$$

Nonequilibrium factor in the low temperature case ($T<\theta$):

$$Z(T,T_v)=\left[f_v\exp(-\frac{T_v}{\theta})+(1-f_v)\exp(-\frac{T}{\theta})\right]^{E_a/\theta}\exp\left(\frac{E_a}{T}\right)$$
