= Nguyễn Xuân Vinh =

Vietnamese aerospace scientist (1930–2022)

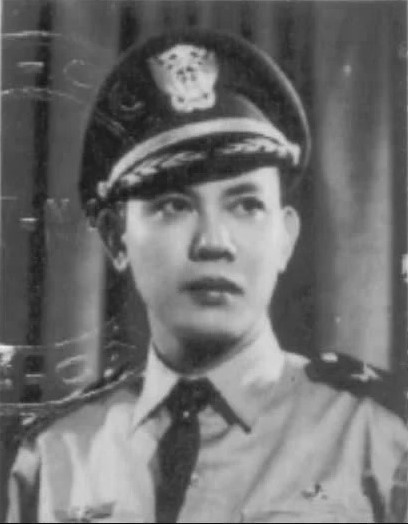
- Born: January 1, 1930; Yên Bái, Tonkin Protectorate (now Vietnam)
- Died: July 23, 2022 (aged 92); Costa Mesa, California, U.S.
- Other name: Nguyen Xuan Vinh
- Education: French Air Force Academy; Aix-Marseille University; University of Colorado at Boulder
- Awards: Dirk Brouwer Award (2006)
- Scientific career
- Workplaces: University of Michigan; South Vietnam Air Force
- Thesis: Geometrical studies of orbital transfer problems (1965)
- Doctoral advisor: Adolf Busemann
- Doctoral students: James Longuski; Daniel J. Scheeres
- Military career
- Allegiance: France; South Vietnam; United States
- Branch: Republic of Vietnam Air Force
- Rank: Air Marshall
- Conflicts: Vietnam War

Nguyễn Xuân Vinh (January 1, 1930 – July 23, 2022) was a Vietnamese-American aerospace scientist and educator. Vinh was Professor Emeritus of Aerospace Engineering at the University of Michigan, where he taught for nearly thirty years. His seminal work on the guidance, dynamics and optimal control of space vehicles and their interaction with the atmosphere played a fundamental role in space exploration and technological development.

== Education ==
Xuân Vinh attended the French Air Force Academy at Salon de Provence where he specialized in Aeronautical Engineering. In 1954, he graduated from the nearby Aix-Marseille University in Mathematics and was commissioned as an officer. The following year, he qualified as a French Air Force multi-engine pilot.

In 1965, Vinh was the recipient of the first PhD in Aerospace Engineering conferred by the University of Colorado at Boulder supervised by Adolf Busemann. In 1972, he was awarded a national doctorate in mathematics by the University of Paris, France.

== Career and research ==
Following his return to Vietnam, Vinh was appointed Chief of Staff in the Republic of Vietnam Air Force in October 1957. In 1958, Vinh became the Commander and first Air Marshal of the Vietnam Air Force at the age of 28. He served as Air Force Commander until 1962 when he resigned and emigrated to the United States.

He joined the University of Michigan in 1968 as an associate professor of Aerospace Engineering and was promoted to the rank of professor in 1972. During his tenure at Michigan, Vinh chaired more than 20 doctoral committees. It is estimated that over 1,000 aerospace engineers studied under him.

=== Publications ===
As a scientist and educator, Vinh published three books and more than 100 papers in mathematics, astrodynamics and trajectory optimization.

In 1960, to promote a cadet recruitment program for the newly created Air Force Academy in Vietnam, he wrote a novel: Pilot’s Life, which became a best-seller (now in its sixth printing) and he was awarded the Republic of Vietnam’s National Literature Prize. The novel is in the form of a series of letters written by a pilot to his sweetheart.

=== Awards and honors ===
In 1994, he was given the Mechanics and Control of Flight Award by the American Institute of Aeronautics and Astronautics. He was a member of the International Academy of Astronautics and a foreign member of the French National Academy of Air and Space.

In 2006, he won the Dirk Brouwer Award, awarded by the American Astronautical Society, for outstanding lifetime achievement in the field of space flight mechanics and astrodynamics.

== Late Year and Death ==
Vinh was baptized as a Catholic at St. Bonaventure Catholic Church in Huntington Beach, California on October 19, 2016, with the baptismal name Anphongsô (Alphonso).

Vinh died at 2:39 p.m. on Saturday, July 23, 2022 at his home in Costa Mesa, California, at the age of 92.

Military offices
Preceded by Trần Văn Hổ	Commander Republic of Vietnam Air Force; 1958–1962	Succeeded by Huỳnh Hữu Hiền
