= Tyvak =

Defunct American smallsat provider (2011–2014/2022)

Tyvak Nano-Satellite Systems
- Type: Private
- Industry: Aerospace
- Founded: 2011; 15 years ago in Irvine, California
- Founders: Jordi Puig-Suari; Scott MacGillivray; Austin Williams; Roland Coelho
- Defunct: 2014 (acquisition), 2022 (name phased out)
- Fate: Acquired by Terran Orbital Corporation
- Headquarters: Boca Raton, Florida, United States
- Key people: Marc Bell (Chairman and Chief Executive Officer)
- Parent: Terran Orbital Corporation
- Website: www.tyvak.com

Tyvak Nano-Satellite Systems was an American company that designed and built satellites. It started as a designer, builder and provider of nanosatellite and CubeSat space vehicle products and services for government and commercial customers. Tyvak was based in Irvine, California. It was a subsidiary of Terran Orbital Corporation. In 2022, it was announced that Tyvak would transition into larger satellites from nanosats and cubesats and the name Tyvak would be phased out in favor of the name of the parent company Terran Orbital.

In 2011, Jordi Puig-Suari, co-inventor of the CubeSat design, and Scott MacGillivray, former manager of nanosatellite programs for Boeing Phantom Works, established Tyvak Nano-Satellite Systems in San Luis Obispo, California, to sell miniature avionics packages for small satellites, with the goal to increase the volume available for payloads.

On 18 November 2019, Tyvak was one of five companies selected to be eligible to bid for the NASA Commercial Lunar Payload Services (CLPS).

In 2022, Terran Orbital company, the company that owns Tyvak, entered public stock market through a SPAC merger. At the time it was announced that the name Tyvak would be phased out and the focus of the whole company (that is, both Tyvak and Terran Orbital) would be transitioned into larger satellites from nanosats and cubesats.

At the end of October 2024, Lockheed Martin acquired Terran Orbital, becoming the sole owner of the company. The company continues its existence as part of Lockheed Martin (rebranded as "Terran Orbital, a Lockheed Martin Company") and continues to produce smallsats.

== Satellites ==
Tyvak-0172 was launched as a rideshare on the Falcon 9 SAOCOM 1B launch 30 August 2020.

Tyvak-0171 was launched as a rideshare on the 16th launch of the Vega rocket on 3 September 2020. OSM-1 Cicero, a 6U remote sensing CubeSat built by Tyvak for Orbital Solutions was also a payload.

Tyvak-0130 was launched as a rideshare on Starlink V1.0 L26 on 15 May 2021.

LunIR launched on Artemis 1 as a secondary payload. It studies the Moon using an infrared sensor and cryocooler. It was built by Lockheed Martin and Tyvak Nano-Satellite Systems.
