= 1746 Brouwer =

Hilda asteroid

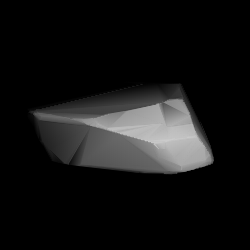
- Shape model of Brouwer from its lightcurve

Discovery
- Discovered by: Indiana University (Indiana Asteroid Program)
- Discovery site: Goethe Link Obs.
- Discovery date: 14 September 1963

Designations
- Named after: Dirk Brouwer (astronomer)
- Alternative designations: 1963 RF · 1940 WE; 1947 QA
- Minor planet category: main-belt · Hilda

Orbital characteristics
- Epoch 4 September 2017 (JD 2458000.5)
- Uncertainty parameter 0
- Observation arc: 76.33 yr (27,878 days)
- Aphelion: 4.7671 AU
- Perihelion: 3.1284 AU
- Semi-major axis: 3.9478 AU
- Eccentricity: 0.2076
- Orbital period (sidereal): 7.84 yr (2,865 days)
- Mean anomaly: 292.05°
- Mean motion: 0° 7^{m} 32.52^{s} / day
- Inclination: 8.3676°
- Longitude of ascending node: 321.96°
- Argument of perihelion: 47.580°
- Jupiter MOID: 0.8580 AU
- T_{Jupiter}: 3.0040

Physical characteristics
- Dimensions: 61.50±1.80 km 62.523±0.492; 64.25±4.9 km (IRAS:2)
- Synodic rotation period: 19.7255±0.0005 h 19.8 h 19.88±0.05 h (Note: Slyusarev (2012) web: rotation period 19.88±0.05 hours with a brightness amplitude of 0.21. Summary figures at Asteroid Lightcurve Database for (1746) Brouwer)
- Geometric albedo: 0.0448±0.008 (IRAS:2); 0.048±0.006; 0.051±0.003
- Spectral type: Tholen = D · D B–V = 0.721; U–B = 0.227
- Absolute magnitude (H): 9.78±0.30 · 9.95 (IRAS:2) · 9.95

1746 Brouwer (prov. designation: 1963 RF) is a Hilda asteroid from the outermost region of the asteroid belt, approximately 64 kilometers in diameter. It was discovered on 14 September 1963, by IU's Indiana Asteroid Program at Goethe Link Observatory near Brooklyn, Indiana, United States. It was named after astronomer Dirk Brouwer.

== Classification and orbit ==
Brouwer is a member of the Hilda family (001), an asteroid family within the dynamical Hilda group, a large group that orbits in resonance with the gas giant Jupiter and are thought to originate from the Kuiper belt. Brouwer orbits the Sun at a distance of 3.1–4.8 AU once every 7 years and 10 months (2,865 days). Its orbit has an eccentricity of 0.21 and an inclination of 8° with respect to the ecliptic.

It was first identified as 1940 WE at Turku Observatory in 1940, extending the body's observation arc by 23 years prior to its official discovery observation.

== Physical characteristics ==
In the Tholen classification, Brouwer is characterized as a dark and reddish D-type asteroid.

=== Rotation period ===
Several rotational lightcurves of Brouwer gave a rotation period between 19.72 and 19.88 hours with a brightness variation of 0.21 and 0.35 magnitude (U=n.a/2/n.a.).

=== Diameter and albedo ===
According to the surveys carried out by the Infrared Astronomical Satellite IRAS, the Japanese Akari satellite, and NASA's Wide-field Infrared Survey Explorer with its subsequent NEOWISE mission, Brouwer measures between 61.50 and 64.25 kilometers in diameter, and its surface has an albedo between 0.045 and 0.051.

The Collaborative Asteroid Lightcurve Link agrees with IRAS, that is an albedo of 0.045 and a diameter of 64.25 kilometers with an absolute magnitude of 9.95.

== Naming ==
This minor planet was named in honor of Dutch–American astronomer Dirk Brouwer (1902–1966). Originally at Leiden University and specialized in celestial mechanics, he became director of the Yale University Observatory and was the president of IAU's commission 20, Positions & Motions of Minor Planets, Comets & Satellites, from 1948 to 1955. The official naming citation was published by the Minor Planet Center on 15 July 1968 (M.P.C. 2883).
