= Robert M. L. Baker Jr. =

American physicist

- Born: September 1, 1930 (age 96)

Robert M. L. Baker Jr. (born September 1, 1930) is an American physicist. He earned a bachelor's degree in physics at UCLA summa cum laude, was elected to Phi Beta Kappa, and earned a master's degree in physics and a Ph.D. in engineering at UCLA. The Ph.D. in engineering, with a specialization in aerospace, was, according to UCLA officials, the first of its kind to be granted in the United States. Baker was a lecturer and assistant professor at UCLA, in astronomy (1959–63) and the Department of Engineering and Applied Science (1963–71). During that time he was also a lecturer at the United States Air Force Academy.

While on a two-year tour of active duty in the United States Air Force, he worked on a variety of classified aerospace projects. In 1961, he became the director of the Lockheed's Astrodynamics Research Center in Bel Air, California. In 1964, Baker joined Computer Sciences Corporation as associate manager for mathematical analysis. In 1980, he was elected president of West Coast University, an accredited university for the adult learner (now operating under the auspices of American Career College in Los Angeles).

After retiring from West Coast University in 1997, Baker became the senior consultant for Transportation Sciences Corporation and Gravwave LLC.

Baker won the UCLA Physics Prize, the Dirk Brouwer Award for outstanding contributions in astrodynamics and orbital mechanics, and the Outstanding Man of the Year Junior Chamber of Commerce award in 1965 presented to him by Ronald Reagan.

== See also ==
- Gravitational wave
