= Lunar cycler =

Type of orbit which passes close to the Earth and Moon

A lunar cycler or Earth–Moon cycler is a cycler orbit, or spacecraft therein, which periodically passes close by the Earth and the Moon, using gravity assists and occasional propellant-powered corrections to maintain its trajectories between the two. If the fuel required to reach a particular cycler orbit from both the Earth and the Moon is modest, and the travel time between the two along the cycler is reasonable, then having a spacecraft in the cycler can provide an efficient and regular method for space transportation.

== History ==
Buzz Aldrin first suggested the use of cycler orbits in 1985 for the life support equipment and logistical supplies necessary for extensive human exploration of the Moon and Mars. He also presented his thoughts on the benefits of using cycler spacecraft at the Space 88 Symposium in Albuquerque during a panel discussion on "Approaching the Construction Problems in Space." These trajectories must have the characteristic that they can be easily targeted for either launch or destination planet and that the times between encounters yield a reasonable stay time at the destination and provide for both routine and emergency return on a fairly regular basis.

== See also ==
- Free-return trajectory – Return of a spacecraft under gravity
- Interstellar cycler – 2002 novel by Karl Schroeder
- Mars cycler – Spacecraft trajectory that encounters Earth and Mars regularly
- Spaceflight – Flight into or through outer space
