= Maurice Zucrow =

Aerospace engineer (1899–1975)

- Born: December 15, 1899; Kyiv, Ukraine, Russian Empire (today Kyiv, Ukraine)
- Died: June 5, 1975 (aged 75); Santa Barbara, California, US
- Education: Harvard University, Purdue University
- Occupations: Rocket engineer, professor
- Spouse: Lillian Feinstein (m. 1925–1975)

Maurice Joseph Zucrow (December 15, 1899 – June 1975) was a Russian-American scientist and aerospace engineer known for his contributions to the development of gas turbines and jet propulsion. Zucrow was born in Kyiv, Ukraine, Russian Empire and immigrated with his family to the United Kingdom in 1900. Young Maurice attended Central Foundation Boys' School in London. The family moved to the US in 1914.

In 1922 Maurice Zucrow became the first person to graduate with a BS degree in engineering from Harvard University. He went on to receive a S.M degree from the same school next year. Zucrow was also the first recipient of a doctoral degree in engineering at Purdue University completing his dissertation in Mechanical Engineering in 1928. His PhD advisor was Andrey Abraham Potter, Dean of Purdue University College of Engineering.

After leaving Purdue in 1929, Zucrow spent 17 years in industry. During his work at Elliott Company, he played an important part in the research and development of the nation's first gas turbine built in 1942. He also helped develop Aerojet’s JATO rocket, used by seaplanes to assist takeoff under adverse conditions. During World War II, Zucrow was asked to teach a course in jet propulsion theory to engineers in the aircraft industry as part of the Engineering, Science, and Management War Training (ESMWT) program at the University of California, Los Angeles.

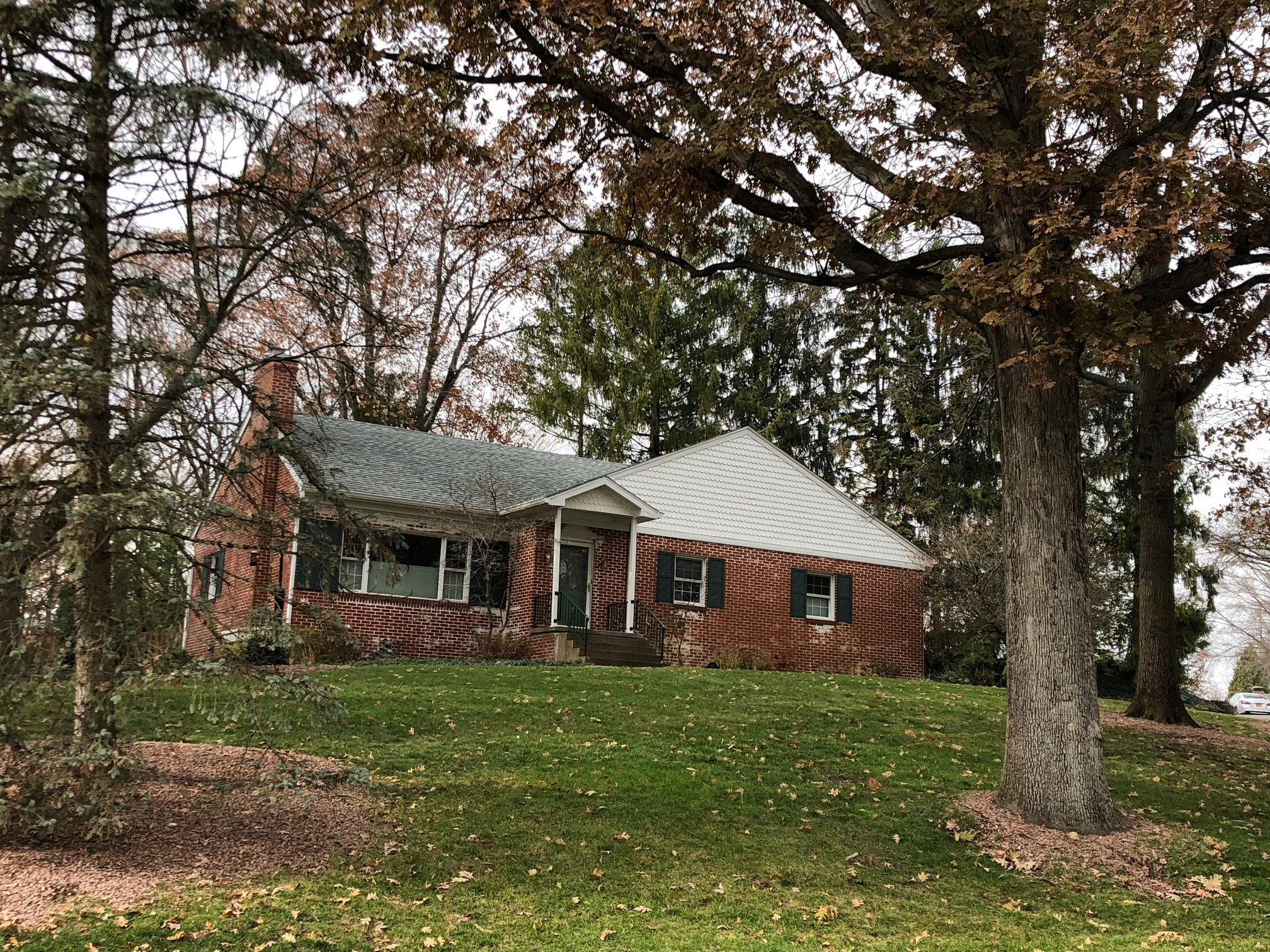
The house Zucrows built in 1951 in West Lafayette, IN. The family lived here until the mid-1960s.

In 1946 he joined the faculty of Purdue School of Aeronautics and Astronautics establishing Purdue's Jet Propulsion Center. The research facility was renamed Maurice J. Zucrow Laboratories in 1998 and is now the world's largest academic propulsion laboratory. In 1948 Zucrow published Principles of Jet Propulsion and Gas Turbines, the first textbook in this field.

In 1957 Zucrow was elected to the board of directors of American Rocket Society together with Wernher von Braun. In 1962 Zucrow received the Sigma Xi national research award and delivered the award lecture entitled "Space Propulsion Engines - Their Characteristics and Problems". He received the Distinguished Civilian Service award from the Department of the Army in 1967.

Zucrow's residence in West Lafayette was 801 Carrolton Boulevard in the Hill and Dales neighborhood adjacent to the Purdue campus.

== Books ==
- Zucrow, M.J., Principles of Jet Propulsion and Gas Turbines, John Wiley & Sons, 1948.
- Zucrow, M.J., Aircraft and Missile Propulsion Volume 1: Thermodynamics of Fluid Flow and Application to Propulsion Engines, John Wiley and Sons, 1958.
- Zucrow, M.J., Aircraft & Missile Propulsion, Volume 2: The Gas Turbine Power Plant, the Turboprop, Turbojet, Ramjet, and Rocket Engines, John Wiley and Sons; First edition, 1958.
- Zucrow, M.J., Gas Dynamics, Volumes 1 and 2, John Wiley & Sons, 1976.
