= Dirk Brouwer Award (American Astronautical Society) =

The Dirk Brouwer Award was established by the American Astronautical Society to honor significant technical contributions to space flight mechanics and astrodynamics and to recognize Dirk Brouwer's outstanding role in celestial mechanics and his widespread influence on workers in space flight and astrodynamics.

== Recipients ==
- Source: American Astronautical Society

- 1972: Theodore Edelbaum
- 1973: John Breakwell
- 1974: Howard Tindall Jr.
- 1975: Robert M. L. Baker
- 1976: Barbara C. Johnson
- 1977: Ronald L. Berry
- 1978: No award
- 1979: Angelo Miele
- 1980: Paul Herget
- 1981: Victor Szebehely
- 1982: Thomas R. Kane
- 1983: Giuseppe Colombo
- 1984: Robert W. Farquhar
- 1985: No award
- 1986: André Deprit
- 1987: John Junkins
- 1988: Richard W. Longman
- 1989: Kyle T. Alfriend and Peter M. Bainum
- 1990: Jer-Nan Juang and Vinod J. Modi
- 1991: No award
- 1992: Antonio L. Elias
- 1993: Robert D. Culp
- 1994: John E. Prussing
- 1995: Byron D. Tapley
- 1996: Richard H. Battin
- 1997: Gerald R. Hollenbeck
- 1998: George H. Born
- 1999: Shannon L. Coffey
- 2000: Malcolm D. Shuster
- 2001: Paul J. Cefola
- 2002: Roger A. Broucke
- 2003: David W. Dunham
- 2004: Kathleen Howell
- 2005: F. Landis Markley
- 2006: Nguyen Xuan Vinh
- 2007: Bernard Kaufman
- 2008: Bob Schutz
- 2009: Bruce Conway
- 2010: Donald J. Kessler
- 2011: F. Kenneth Chan
- 2012: Daniel J. Scheeres
- 2013: Robert H. Bishop
- 2014: Srinivas R. Vadali
- 2015: Daniele Mortari
- 2016: Felix Hoots
- 2017: Arun Misra
- 2018: Martin W. Lo
- 2019: Robert Melton
- 2020: Maruthi Akella
- 2021: John Crassidis
- 2022: Chris D'Souza

== See also ==
- List of space technology awards
- Prizes named after people
