= Daniel Dumbacher =

Robert H Goddard Memorial Symposium at the Greenbelt Marriott. Panel - Developing Tomorrow's workforce. Dan Dumbacher. Robert Curbeam Matthew Simon. Sophia Porter.

Daniel Dumbacher is an American aerospace engineer, educator and administrator. Dumbacher was appointed an executive director of American Institute of Aeronautics and Astronautics in 2017. He served as deputy associate administrator of NASA's Human Exploration and Operations Mission Directorate from 2007 to 2014. Dumbacher was a professor at Purdue University School of Aeronautics and Astronautics from 2014 to 2017.

Dumbacher earned a BS in mechanical engineering from Purdue University in 1981 and an MBA from the University of Alabama in Huntsville in 1984.
