= Thomas N. Farris =

Thomas Neal Farris is an American aerospace engineering professor and university administrator. He is known for his research on mechanics of fretting fatigue. Tom Farris was the Dean of Rutgers School of Engineering from 2009-2022. He served as the Head of Purdue University School of Aeronautics and Astronautics from 1998 to 2009.

Farris received a BS degree in mechanical engineering in 1982 from Rice University and a Ph.D. in Applied Mechanics at Northwestern University in 1986.

Farris is a Fellow of American Society of Mechanical Engineers since 2001 and a Fellow of American Institute of Aeronautics and Astronautics since 2009.
