= Daniel J. Scheeres =

American aerospace engineer

Academic background
- Education: BS, Letters and Engineering, 1985, Calvin College; BSE, Aerospace Engineering, 1987, MSE, 1988, PhD, 1992, University of Michigan
- Thesis: On symmetric central configurations with application to satellite motion about rings. (1992)
- Doctoral advisor: Nguyễn Xuân Vinh

Daniel Jay Scheeres is an American aerospace engineer. He is the A. Richard Seebass Endowed Chair and Distinguished Professor at the University of Colorado, Boulder. In honor of his "pioneering work into the investigation of the dynamics of orbits close to small, irregularly shaped minor planets," Asteroid (8887) 1994LK1 was renamed (8887) Scheeres in 1999.

== Early life and education ==
Scheeres completed his Letters and Engineering from Calvin College in 1985 and his Bachelor of Engineering degree from the University of Michigan. Following this, Scheeres remained at the University of Michigan for his Master's degree and PhD in aerospace engineering.

== Career ==
=== University of Michigan ===
Upon completing his Ph.D., Scheeres worked at the Jet Propulsion Lab's Navigation Systems Section for five years. In honor of his "pioneering work into the investigation of the dynamics of orbits close to small, irregularly shaped minor planets," Asteroid (8887) 1994LK1 was renamed (8887) Scheeres in 1999. He then returned to the University of Michigan as an assistant professor of aerospace engineering, where he helped collect radar images of a metallic, dog bone-shaped asteroid in 2000. He used the measured shape of the asteroid to evaluate conditions on its surface and to discern whether the asteroid were two separate "ends" in orbit about each other. Following this, Scheeres was granted a promotion from the rank of assistant professor without tenure to associate professor with tenure.

In 2005, Scheeres co-led a team of scientists to discover, for the first time in history, how the Earth's gravity would disrupt a massive asteroid's spin. The following year, he was part of the team studying Itokawa, an asteroid, that determined the asteroid's mass, surface environment, and gravitational pull and helped interpret the images that were taken of the asteroid from the spacecraft.

=== CU Boulder ===
Scheeres joined the faculty at the University of Colorado, Boulder (CU Boulder) in 2008. As the A. Richard Seebass Endowed Chair in the Department of Aerospace Engineering Sciences, Scheeres was appointed to the rank of Distinguished Professor and elected a Fellow of the American Institute of Aeronautics and Astronautics. In 2017, Scheeres was elected a member of the National Academy of Engineering (NAE) for his “pioneering work on the motion of bodies in strongly perturbed environments, such as near asteroids and comets."
