= William H. Gerstenmaier =

American aerospace engineer (born 1954)

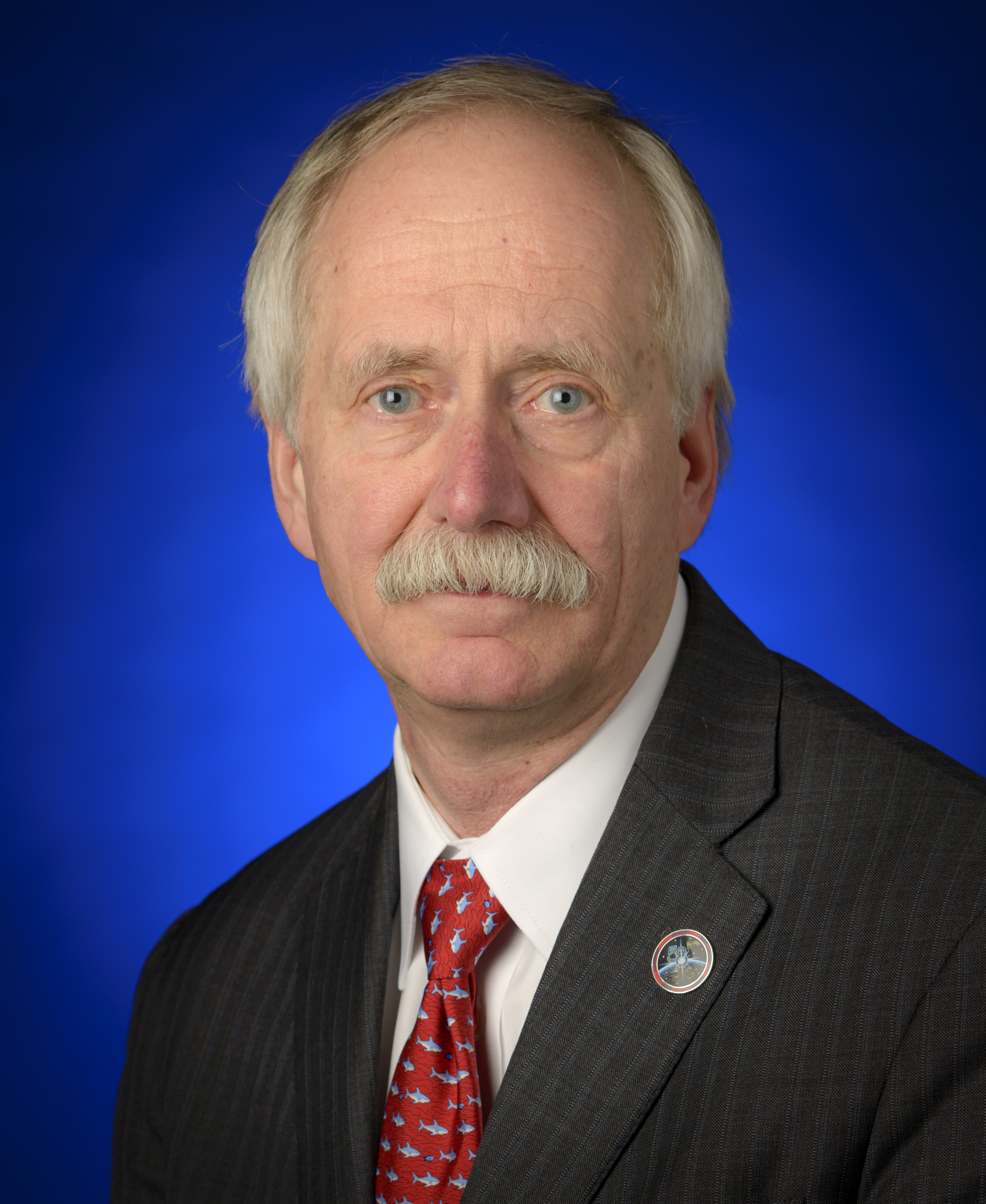
- Gerstenmaier in 2019
- Born: September 28, 1954 (age 72); Akron, Ohio, U.S.
- Education: Purdue University (BS, PhD); University of Toledo (MS)
- Title: Vice President, Build and Flight Reliability, SpaceX
- Spouse: Marsha Ann Gerstenmaier

William H. Gerstenmaier (born September 28, 1954) is an American aerospace engineer and policymaker who is the Vice President of Build and Flight Reliability at SpaceX. He previously served as NASA's Associate Administrator for Human Exploration and Operations between 2005 and July 10, 2019. While in that role, he was described as "arguably the most influential person when it comes to US spaceflight." Prior to being Associate Administrator, Gerstenmaier served as the International Space Station Office Program Manager, at Johnson Space Center, a position he began in June 2002. He spent a total of four decades with NASA.

In February 2020, SpaceX announced that Gerstenmaier had joined the company as a consultant. He was promoted to Vice President, Build and Flight Reliability, one year later.

== Early life ==
Gerstenmaier was born in Akron, Ohio, in September 1954 and graduated from East High School in 1973. As a teenager he followed the early space programs of Mercury, Gemini, and Apollo. He had early dreams of being a test pilot, and after high school, enrolled at the United States Naval Academy. After seeing so many pilots returning from the Vietnam War, he thought he may not get a chance to fly, and chose to reconsider his path. He transferred to Purdue's School of Aeronautics and Astronautics, hoping to get into flight via academics. During his time at Purdue, Gerstenmaier found a great interest in spaceflight technology, and chose to focus on this area for his career.

== Career ==
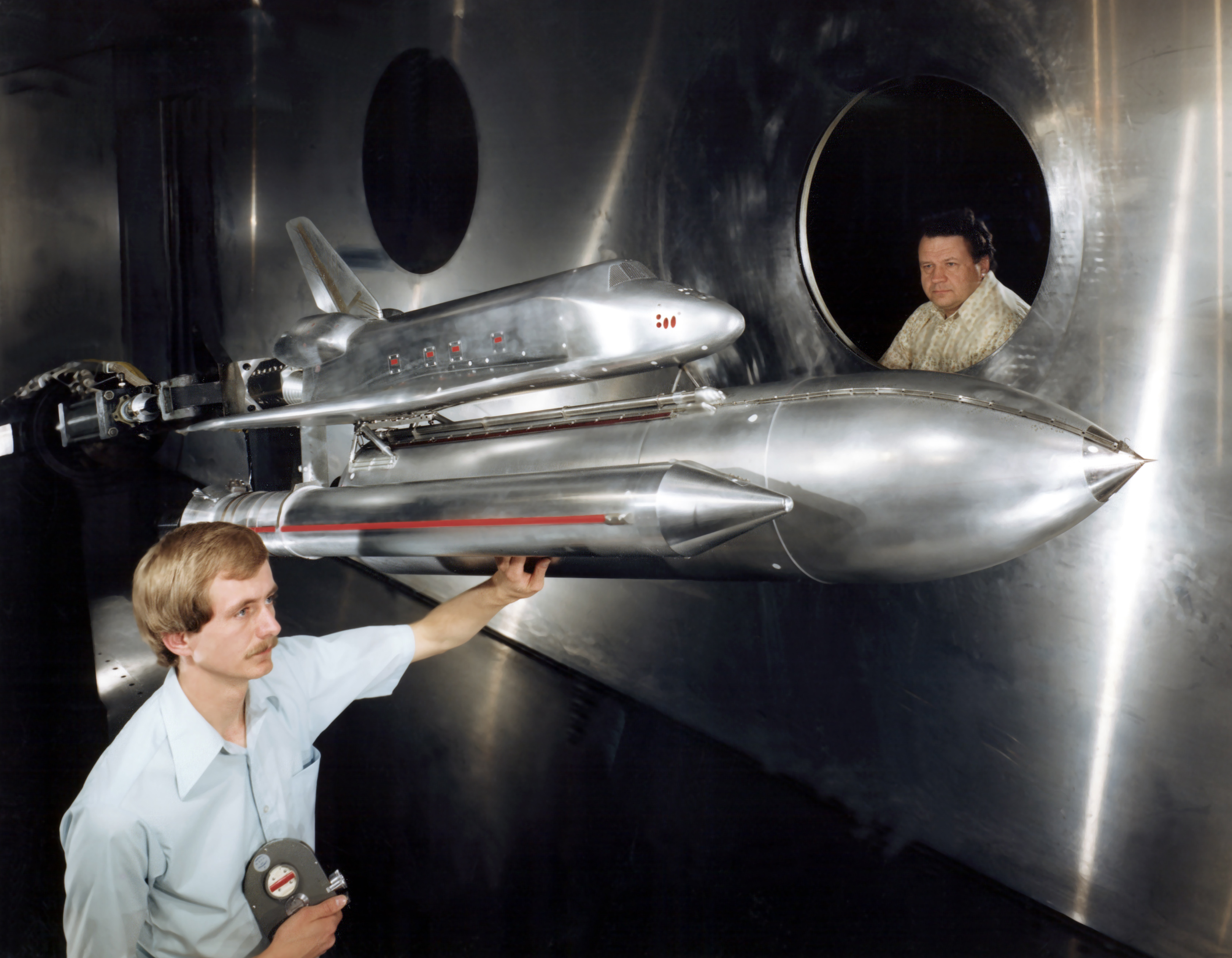
Gerstenmaier (left) working on a space shuttle wind tunnel test at the Glenn Research Center in 1978

Gerstenmaier graduated with a bachelor of science in aeronautical engineering from Purdue University School of Aeronautics and Astronautics in 1977, and joined the Lewis Research Center (now called the John Glenn Research Center) in Ohio, beginning his career with NASA. Initially doing research with supersonic wind tunnels, developing air data curve information used during entry on the Space Shuttle. Gerstenmaier continued his education, obtaining his master's degree in mechanical engineering at the University of Toledo in 1981.

In 1980, Gerstenmaier moved to Houston, Texas, to work at the Johnson Space Center, researching propulsion related to the Space Shuttle, and was involved in the earliest phases of the International Space Station design. In 1984, he was a semi-finalist in the selection for NASA Astronaut Group 10. In 1988, he first served as manager of Space Shuttle Program Integration, and then went on to serve as head of the Orbital Maneuvering Vehicle Operations Office. Following that, he became Director of Space Shuttle and Space Station Freedom Assembly Operations, and was named Chief of the Projects and Facilities Branch of the Flight Design and Dynamics Division.

In 1992, Gerstenmaier was given a fellowship from NASA to obtain his doctorate degree from Purdue, and in 1992 and 1993, he completed course work for a doctorate in dynamics and control, with a minor in propulsion at Purdue University School of Aeronautics and Astronautics. Of the time away from NASA, he said, "It was the most humbling experience of my life." At the time, Gerstenmaier returned to work at NASA before completing the final steps needed to receive his doctorate. He was granted an honorary doctorate from Purdue University in 2019; he had completed the coursework for a PhD in dynamics and control (with a minor in propulsion) at Purdue in 1992–1993 but returned to NASA before finishing the degree.

In 1995, Gerstenmaier returned to NASA as the Shuttle/Mir Program Operations Manager, and was the liaison to the Russian Space Agency for operations and protocols. For the first half of 1996, he was stationed in Russia to support astronaut Shannon Lucid, who spent six months aboard Mir.

In December 2000, Gerstenmaier was named Deputy Manager of the International Space Station Program. In June 2002, Gerstenmaier was promoted to Program Manager of the International Space Station, overseeing the management, development, operation, and integration of the station for NASA. Gerstenmaier's time with the ISS team, came as the first crews began to occupy the station and the US Orbital Segment was under heavy construction.

Gerstenmaier was promoted to Associate Administrator for Human Exploration and Operations in 2005. While in that role, he was described as "arguably the most influential person when it comes to US spaceflight."

Interview with Gerstenmaier while at the launch of Expedition 56-57 from the Baikonur Cosmodrome to the International Space Station in 2018

He would oversee the Commercial Crew Program that would see NASA pivot from the traditional model of government-owned and operated spacecraft, to one where the agency would act as a customer, purchasing flights as needed.

In one particularly critical decision, Gerstenmaier pushed back when Boeing had lobbied NASA for a sole-source contract, arguing that it needed the Commercial Crew Program's full budget to develop its Starliner capsule. While Gerstenmaier considered the Starliner proposal as stronger, he was hesitant to award a sole-source contract. The multi-year Commercial Crew Program had been designed to foster competition and redundancy, and Gerstenmaier believed that selecting just one company would undermine these goals. Through his efforts, he successfully convinced NASA to delay the CCtCap announcement and secure additional funding to support two competing efforts.

After four decades with the agency, NASA Administrator Jim Bridenstine announced on July 10, 2019, that Gerstenmaier was being reassigned to a "special advisor" roles, which are typically considered a demotion and a way to push civil servants who can not be fired out of the agency. No reason was given for the reassignment.

SpaceX hired Gerstenmaier away from NASA in February 2020 in what was originally announced as a role as a consultant to Hans Koenigsmann, the company's vice president of mission assurance.

In February 2020, SpaceX announced that Gerstenmaier had joined the company as a consultant to Hans Koenigsmann, the company's Vice President of Mission Assurance. When Koenigsmann announced he was retiring in February 2021, SpaceX said that Gerstenmaier had agreed to join the company as its Vice President of Build and Flight Reliability. In this role, Gerstenmaier has the responsibility for the safe completion of SpaceX missions.

== Awards ==
Gerstenmaier has twice been awarded the Aviation Week and Space Technology's Laureate Award for "Outstanding Achievement in the Field of Space", as well as three NASA Certificates of Commendation, two NASA Exceptional Service Medals, a Senior NASA Outstanding Leadership Medal, and the Presidential Rank Award for Meritorious Executives.

In 2003, he received the Presidential Rank Award for Meritorious Executives. Also that year he received the Outstanding Aerospace Engineer Award, Purdue University.

In 2004, Gerstenmaier was selected as a finalist for the Service to America Medal, for "Leading the efforts to continue the safe operation of the International Space Station in the absence of the Space Shuttle, allowing continued research and preservation of its unique capabilities for the future."

In 2006, the Huntsville National Space Club awarded him the Von Braun Award.

In 2007, The Federation of Galaxy Explorers honored Gerstenmaier with the 2007 Space Leadership Award, and Purdue University honored him with the Distinguished Alumni Award, "For outstanding accomplishments in a career dedicated to the human exploration of space and international cooperation in space." In November 2008 he was honored again at Purdue as an Old Master in the 2008 Old Masters Program.

Gerstenmaier received the Rotary National Award for Space Achievement's National Space Trophy in 2010, Space Transportation Leadership Award, 2011, the 2011 AIAA von Braun Award for Excellence in Space Program Management and the AIAA von Karman Lectureship in Astronautics in 2012.

Gerstenmaier was elected as a member into the National Academy of Engineering in 2018 for technical contributions and leadership in national and international human spaceflight programs.
