= Purdue University School of Aeronautics and Astronautics =

Coordinates: 40.431057°N 86.914451°W

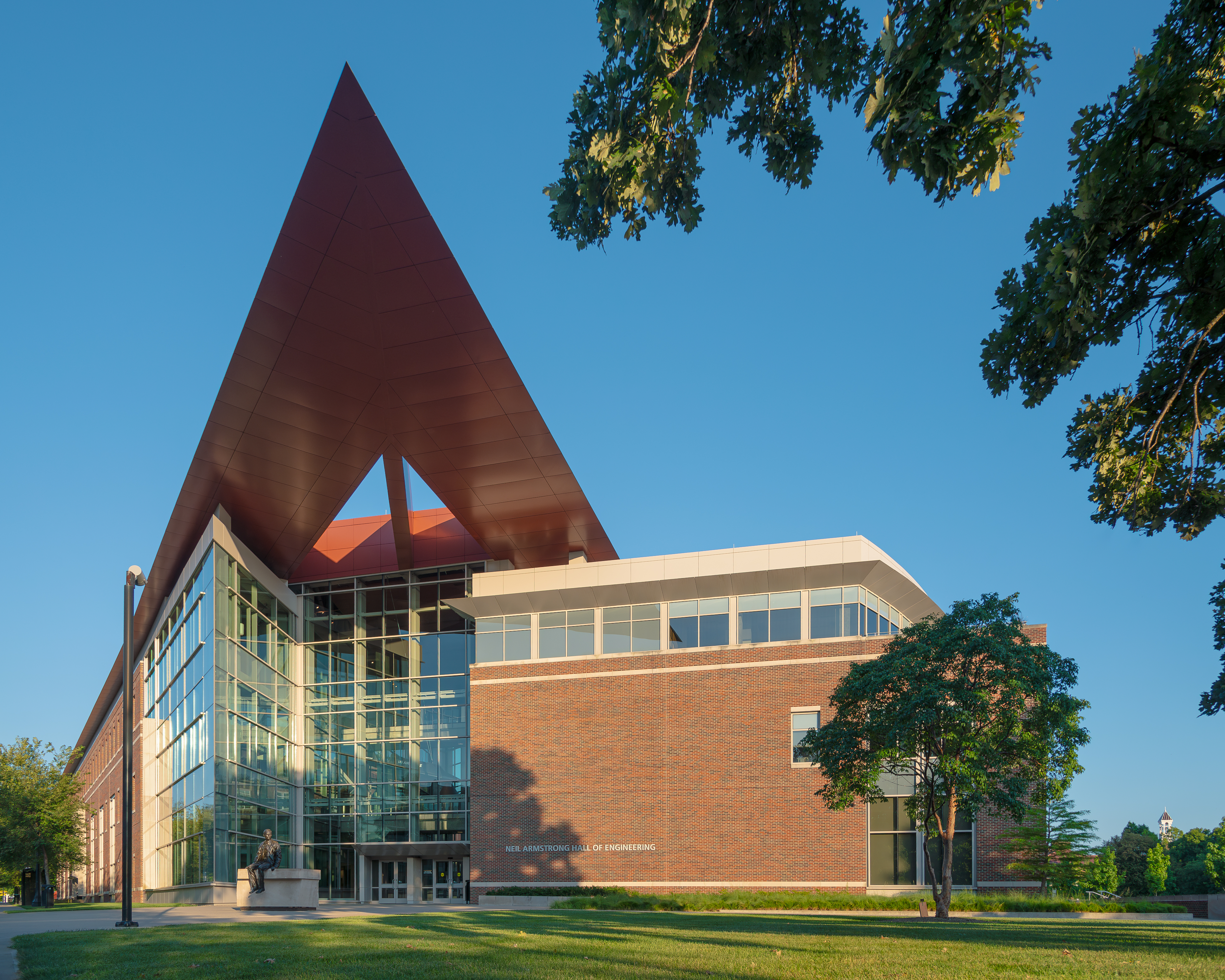
- Established: 1945
- Affiliations: Purdue University
- Head: William Crossley
- Faculty: 38
- Administrative staff: 32
- Undergraduates: 927 (Fall 2019)
- Postgraduates: 504 (Fall 2017)
- Location: 701 W. Stadium Ave. West Lafayette, IN 47907, West Lafayette, Indiana, United States
- Website: engineering.purdue.edu/AAE

The Purdue University School of Aeronautics and Astronautics is a department-level school within the College of Engineering at Purdue University.

The school offers B.S., M.S., and Ph.D. degrees in aeronautical and astronautical engineering. It also provides distance graduate education, including an online M.S. in Engineering with concentration in Aeronautics and Astronautics, and a distance Ph.D. Its main office and some of its labs are located in the Neil Armstrong Hall of Engineering. As of 2010, the School has awarded an estimated 6% of BS degrees and 7% of PhDs in aerospace engineering in the United States.

== History ==
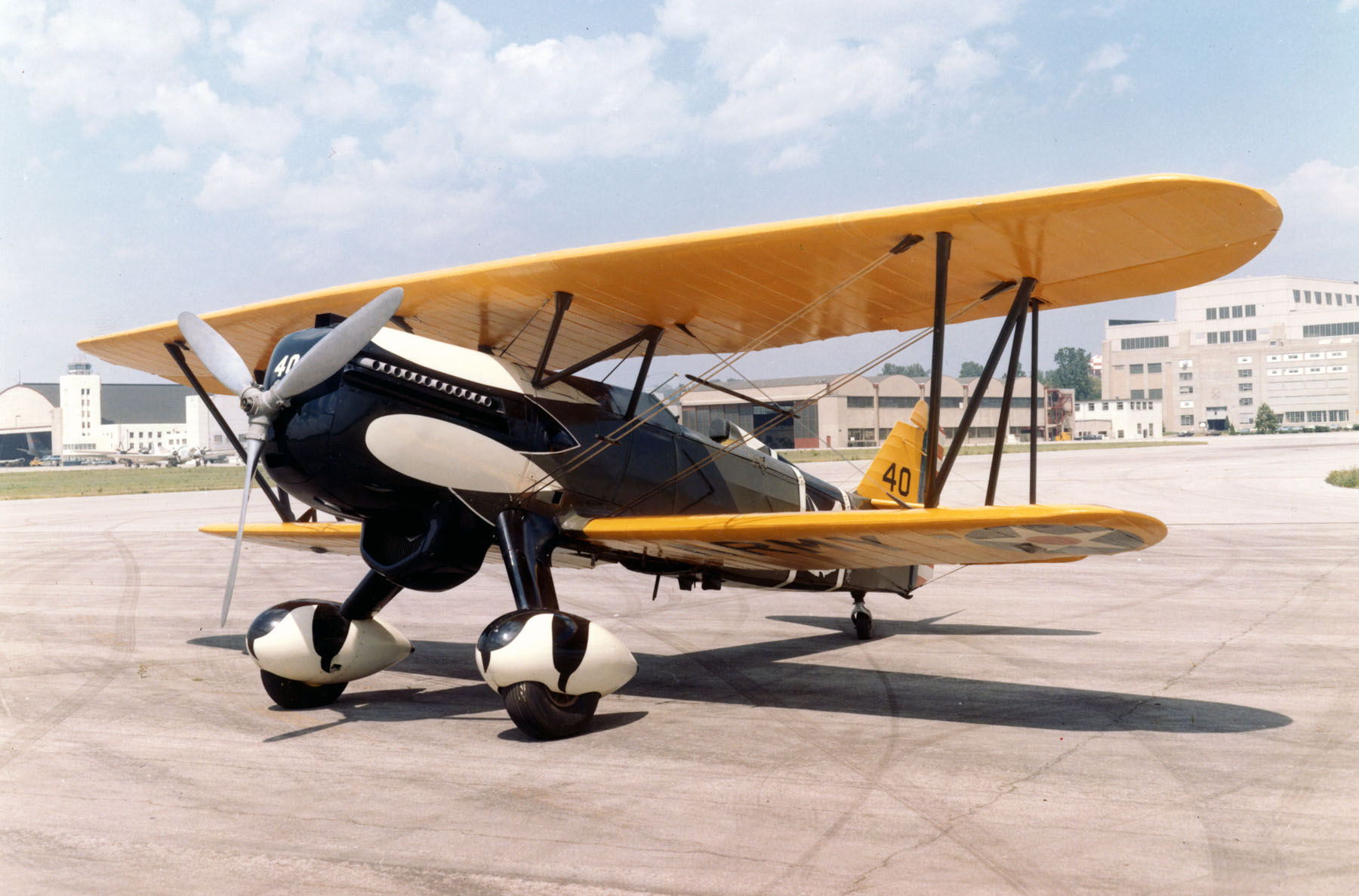
A P-6E restored by Purdue students

Aeronautical engineering education and research at Purdue dates back to early 1920s when the Aeronautical Engineering courses were offered as part of Senior Aeronautical Option in the mechanical engineering program. By 1930s the course offerings in aeronautical engineering expanded to eight with many courses taught at the Purdue Airport, the world's first university-owned airport that opened in 1934. The formal four-year curriculum in aeronautical engineering was developed by World War II and in 1942, Mechanical Engineering became the "School of Mechanical and Aeronautical Engineering." The school was officially established as a separate degree program on July 1, 1945.

Graduate education at the School began with a master's degree program in Aeronautical Engineering in 1946. Ph.D. program was approved for aerodynamics and propulsion in 1948, followed by the structures area in the early 1950s. Purdue's first Ph.D. in Aeronautical Engineering was awarded to R. L. Duncan in 1950 for his work with Professor Maurice Zucrow on the performance of gas turbines.

The school's present name was adopted in 1973.

Purdue students have built and restored several aircraft as part of the program. The sole Curtiss P-6 Hawk was restored by students and resides at the National Museum of the United States Air Force. In 1971 students restored a Ryan PT-22 Recruit, and completed a homebuilt Schreder HP-14 glider.

== Facilities ==
Purdue is home to the largest aerospace propulsion laboratory in the world. Maurice J. Zucrow Laboratories spreads across 24 acres and includes research facilities in combustion, turbines and compressors, energetic materials, hypersonics, aerodynamics, and fluid mechanics.

It is also home to the largest indoor motion capture space in the world, the Purdue UAS Research and Test Facility. PURT has 600,000 cubic feet of open space, which is large enough that fixed-wing drone aircraft can safely fly inside. Motion capture cameras and systems, which are common in special effects in filmmaking, is used in drone research to verify unmanned systems navigation algorithms. The positioning data calculated by the drone can be compared to the drone's actual position as determined by the motion capture system. The motion capture system at PURT provides accuracy to within one millimeter.

In 2023, the PU Applied Research Institute opened its 65,000 square feet (6,000 m^{2}) Hypersonics and Applied Research Facility that has a Mach 8 quiet wind tunnel, designed to closely simulate hypersonic flight, and a hypersonic pulse shock tunnel that uses shock waves of high-temperature air to simulate various flight scenarios (donated by Northrop Grumman from its hypersonics facility in Ronkonkoma, New York.)

== Notable alumni ==
Many of its graduates have gone on to become astronauts or other prominent members of the aerospace and defense industry. Purdue University has graduated 24 astronauts, more than any other public institution, and 15 of those hold degrees from the aerospace department. The only non-military institution to graduate more astronauts is the Massachusetts Institute of Technology. One-third of all of NASA's crewed space flights have had at least one Purdue graduate aboard, and two of the six American astronauts to fly on the Russian space station Mir held Purdue degrees.

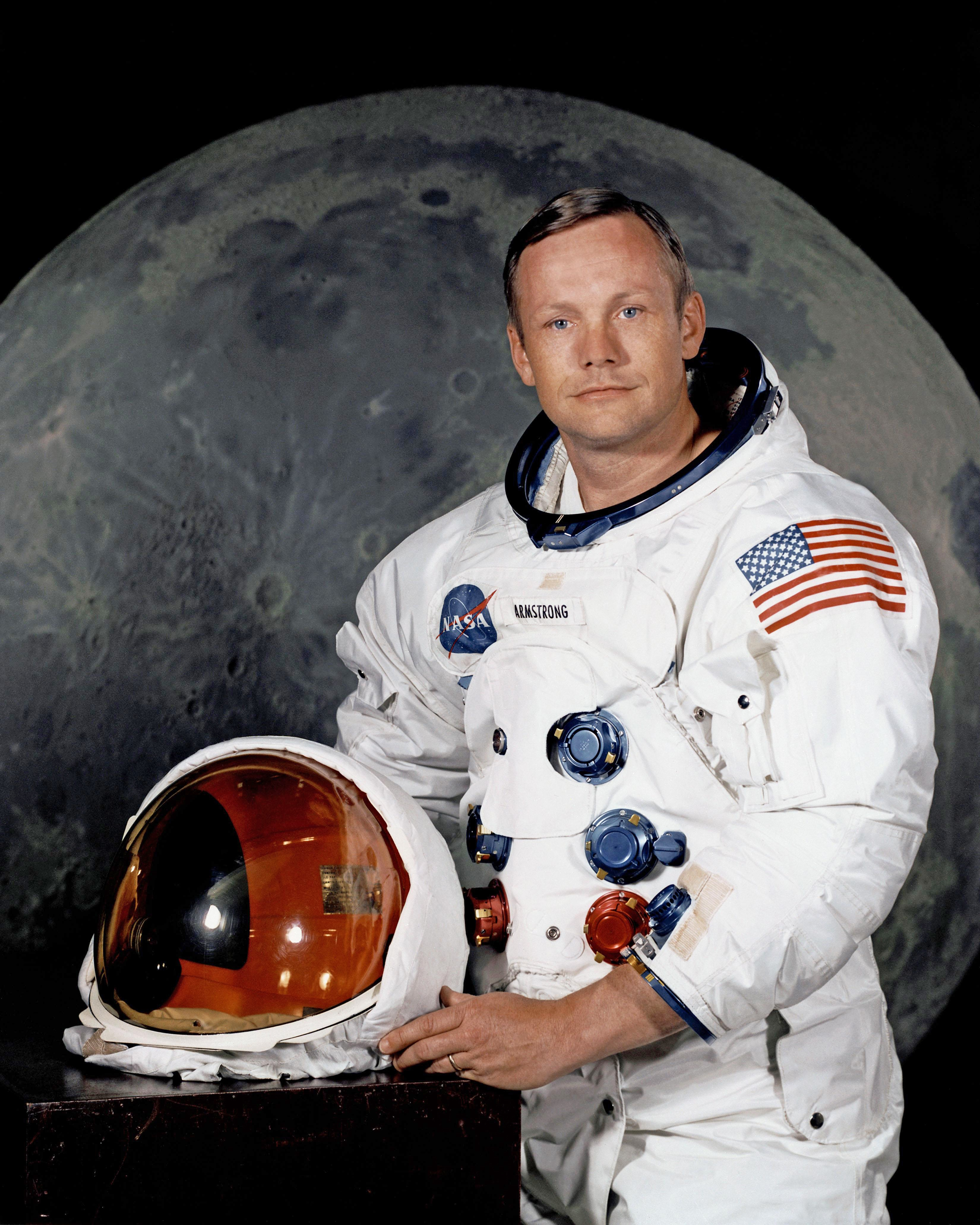
Neil Armstrong BSAAE '55

=== Astronauts with Purdue mechanical engineering degrees ===
- Gus Grissom, B.S. in Mechanical Engineering, 1950

=== Astronauts with Purdue aerospace degrees ===
- Neil A. Armstrong, B.S. in Aeronautical Engineering, 1955
- Sirisha Bandla, B.S. in Aeronautical and Astronautical Engineering, 2011
- John E. Blaha, M.S. in Astronautics, 1966
- Roy D. Bridges, Jr., M.S. in Astronautics, 1966
- Mark N. Brown, B.S. in Aeronautical and Astronautical Engineering, 1973
- John H. Casper, M.S. in Astronautics, 1967
- Roger B. Chaffee, B.S. in Aeronautical Engineering, 1957
- Richard O. Covey, M.S. in Aeronautics and Astronautics, 1969
- Guy S. Gardner, M.S. in Aeronautics and Astronautics, 1970
- Henry Charles Gordon, B.S. in Aeronautical and Astronautical Engineering, 1950
- Gregory J. Harbaugh, B.S. in Aeronautical and Astronautical Engineering, 1978
- Beth Moses, B.S. and M.S. in Aeronautical and Astronautical Engineering, 1992 and 1994
- Loral O'Hara, M.S. in Aeronautical and Astronautical Engineering, 2009
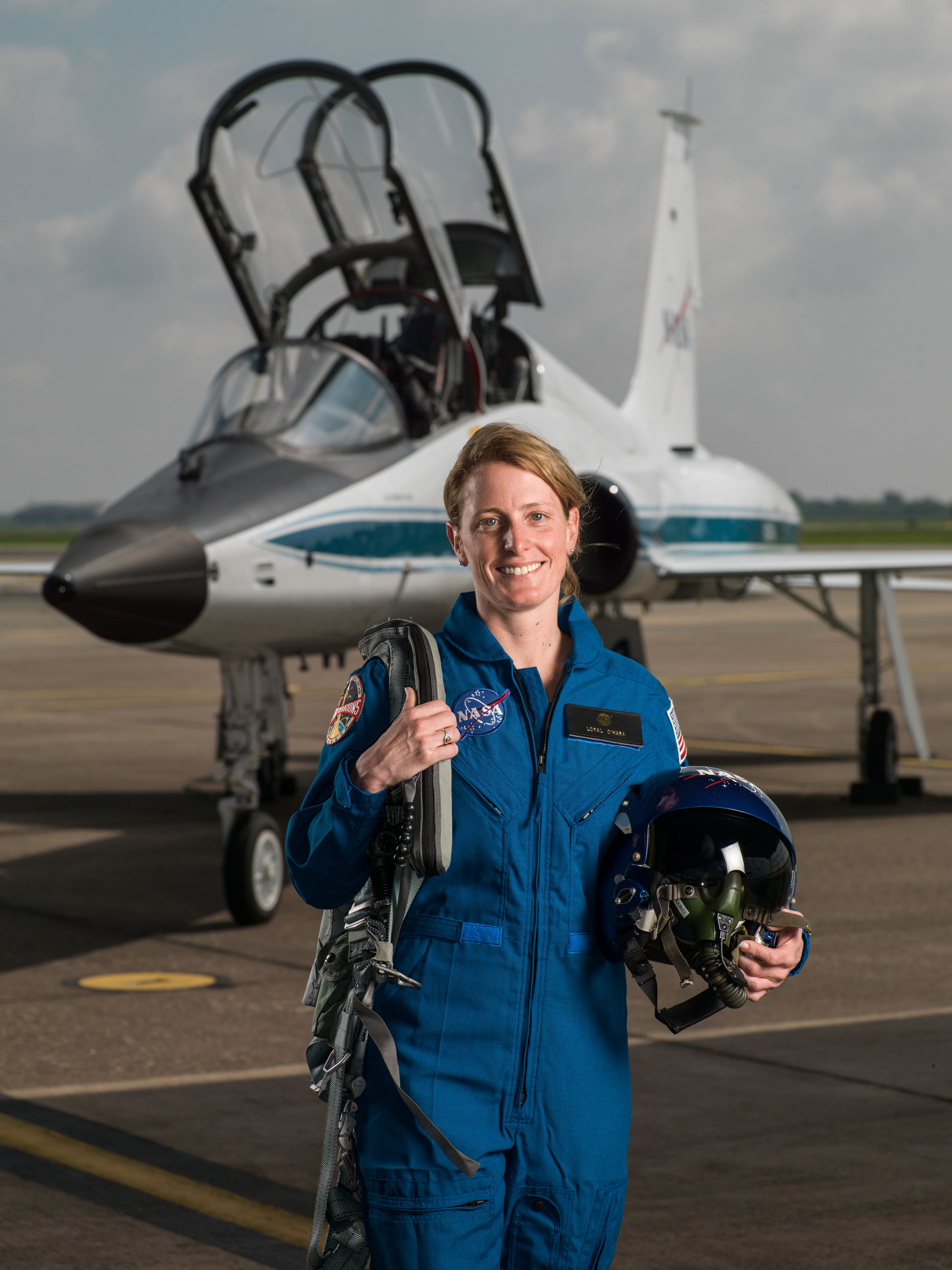
  Loral O'Hara MSAAE 2009
- Gary E. Payton, M.S. in Aeronautics and Astronautics, 1972
- Mark L. Polansky, B.S., M.S. in Aeronautical and Astronautical Engineering, 1978
- Audrey Powers, B.S. Aeronautical and Astronautical Engineering, 1999
- Loren J. Shriver, M.S. in Astronautics, 1968
- Charles D. Walker, B.S. in Aeronautical and Astronautical Engineering, 1971

=== Aerospace engineers and inventors ===
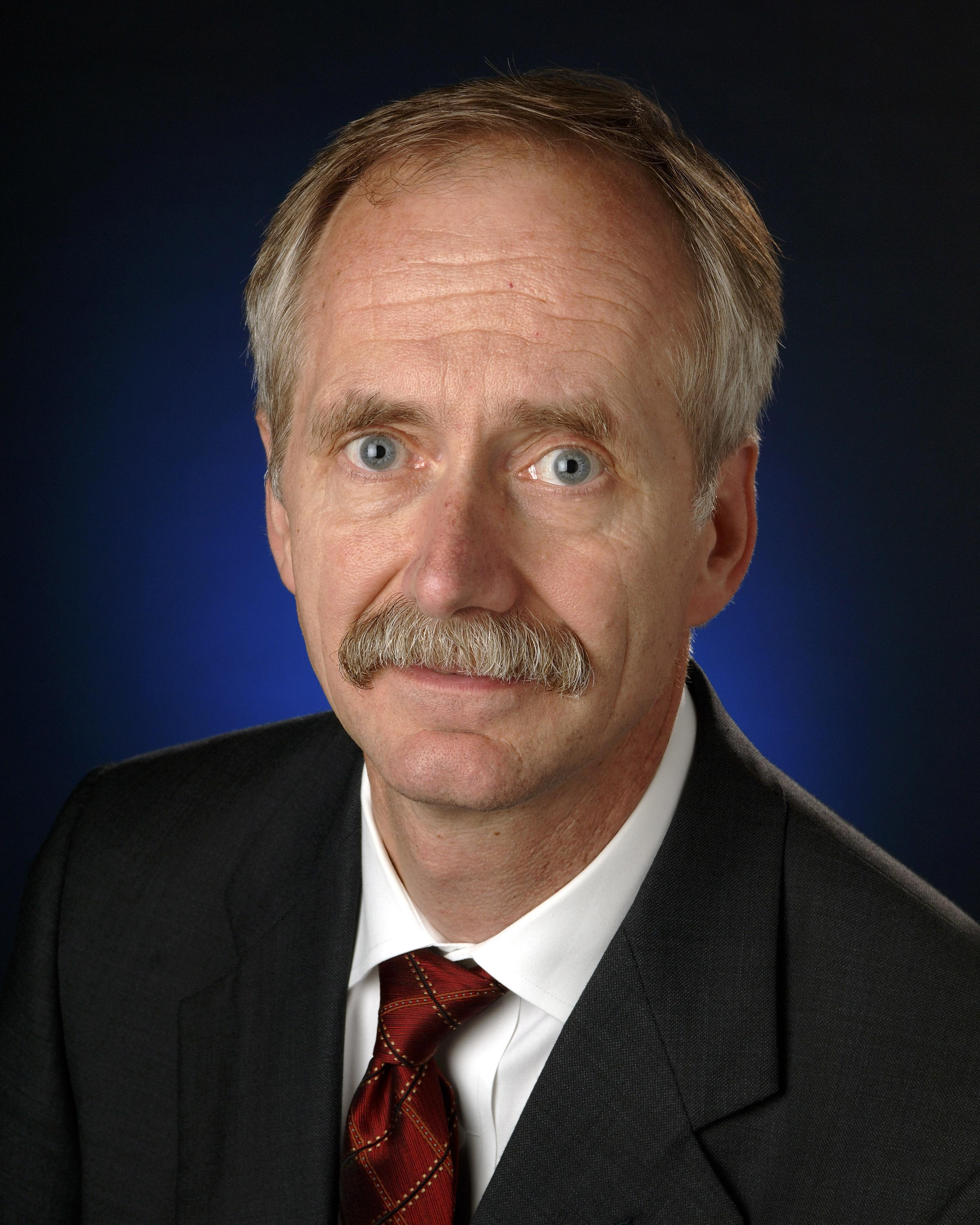
Bill Gerstenmaier BSAAE ’77

- Paul Bevilaqua, the principal inventor of lift fan engine for the Joint Strike Fighter F-35B
- Gene Porter Bridwell, seventh director of NASA Marshall Space Flight Center
- William H. Gerstenmaier, Associate Administrator for Space Operations for NASA
- John L. Hudson, Program Director for Joint Strike Fighter
- John H. McMasters
- Jordi Puig-Suari, co-inventor of CubeSat
- Daniel Raymer, a widely recognized expert in aircraft conceptual design

=== Business executives ===
- Mike Moses, President of Virgin Galactic

=== Others ===
- John H. Griffith, Bell X-1 test pilot
- Dennis Epple, American economist

== Notable faculty ==
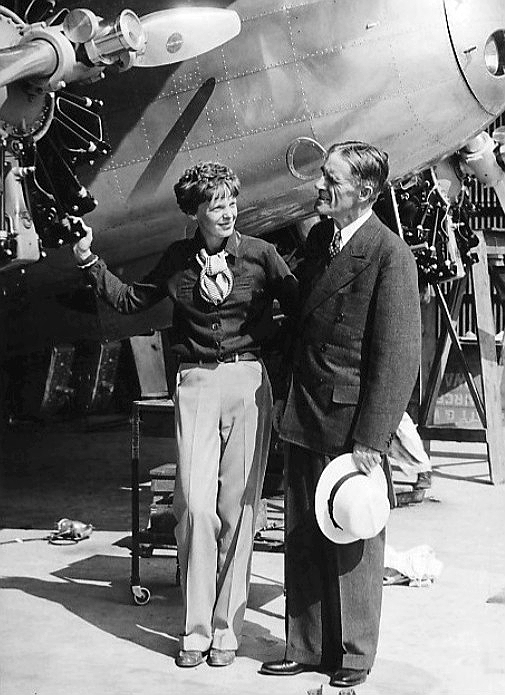
Amelia Earhart with Purdue president Elliott at Purdue Airport, 1936

- Daniel Dumbacher, 2014–2017
- Amelia Earhart, 1935–1937
- Thomas N. Farris, 1986–2009
- Kathleen Howell
- Georgios Lianis, 1959–1978
- James Longuski
- Sergey Macheret
- R. Byron Pipes
- Shu Shien-Siu, 1968–1979
- David A. Spencer, 2016–2020
- David Wolf
- Karl Dawson Wood, 1937–1944
- Henry T. Yang, 1969–1994
- Maurice Zucrow, 1946–1953

== Student organizations ==
The School of Aeronautics & Astronautics is also home to many student organizations that engage its members in a wide array of social, outreach, engineering and service activities.

=== Aero Assist ===
Aero Assist is a student organization at Purdue University that caters to graduate students within the school of Aeronautics & Astronautics. A committee of 10 graduate students organizes several activities that are beneficial to graduate students such as the Research Symposium Series, the Graduate Mentor Program and recreational/leisure activities for the students.

=== Aeronautical and Astronautical Engineering Student Advisory Council ===
AAESAC serves to facilitate interactions and the relationship between faculty and the student body, to advise the administration on issues and concerns of students pertaining to the department, and generally strives to improve the school in hopes of enhancing the educational experience.

=== American Institute of Aeronautics & Astronautics ===
AIAA is the leading professional society for the field of aerospace engineering. The Purdue chapter works to support the institute's main objectives which is to advance the arts, sciences, and technologies pertaining to the aerospace field.

=== Amateur Student and Teacher Rocketry Organization ===
A.S.T.R.O is not only focused on research of solid fuel rocketry, but interacting with the community as well.

=== Purdue Space Day ===
Organized by university students, Purdue Space Day (PSD) is an annual educational outreach program, which provides school students in grades 3-8 the opportunity to learn about science, technology, engineering, and math (STEM) by participating in three age-appropriate activity sessions throughout the day.

=== Sigma Gamma Tau ===
SGT is the American honor society for engineering students. It was founded at Purdue University on February 28, 1953. It seeks to identify and recognize achievement and excellence in the Aerospace field.

=== Students for the Exploration and Development of Space ===
SEDS is a prominent student-run international grass-roots movement dedicated to space advocacy. The Purdue chapter, known as the Purdue Space Program, oversees five rocketry teams, a satellite team, and promotes science outreach at local elementary schools and science centers as well as participating in space conferences such as Space Vision, NewSpace, and ISDC. Beginning in 2020, Purdue Space Program began hosting the Midwest Rocketry Forum, a podcast focusing on various stories in the space industry. Guests include Purdue alumnus, YouTube personalities, and United Launch Alliance CEO Tory Bruno. The chapter formerly hosted the Spring Space Forum, an event in which prominent members of industry, academic, and other space-related fields were invited to discuss a relevant issue. In the summer of 2022, the team began the first collegiate organization to fly a liquid methane / liquid oxygen rocket engine. The Boomie Zoomie B launch vehicle became the first liquid oxygen/liquid methane rocket to launch twice within 48 hours in June 2022, and launched for a third time with a revised valving system less than a month later.

=== Women in Aerospace ===
The purpose of Women in Aerospace is to provide undergraduate women in the aerospace engineering program educational, social, and professional opportunities. WIA seeks to raise awareness of the gender disparity in aerospace engineering and encourage to learn more about how to create inclusive environments.
