= Panagiotis Tsiotras =

- Education: Purdue University (PhD)
- Scientific career
- Fields: Aerospace engineering
- Workplaces: Georgia Institute of Technology
- Thesis: Analytic Theory of Asymmetric Rigid Bodies Subject to Arbitrary Body-Fixed Torques and Forces (1993)
- Doctoral advisor: James Longuski
- Website: www.ae.gatech.edu/people/panagiotis-tsiotras

Panagiotis Tsiotras is a professor of aerospace engineering at Georgia Institute of Technology. He has studied variable-speed control moment gyroscopes in connection with flywheel energy storage and has built a spacecraft simulator based on them.
