= Cycler =

Proposed spacecraft in a closed transfer orbit between two celestial bodies

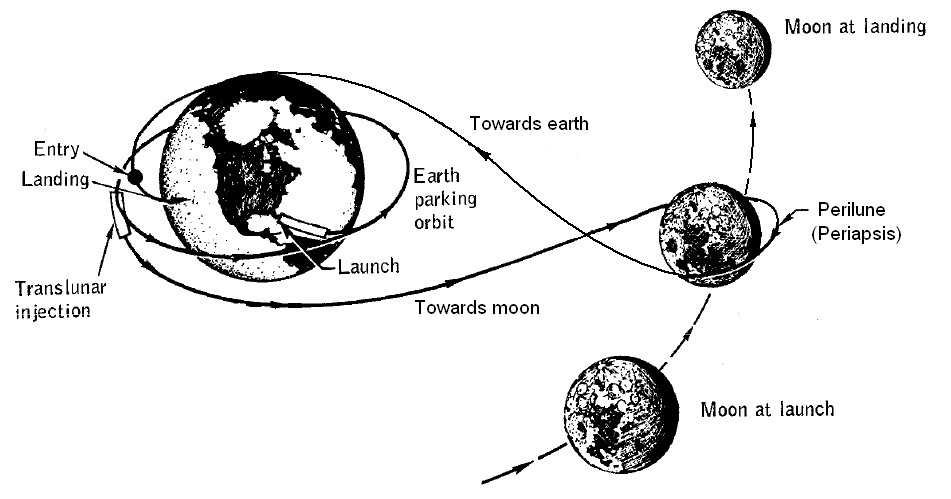
Sketch of a circumlunar free return trajectory (not to scale), plotted on the rotating reference frame rotating slightly faster than a sidereal month.

A cycler is a potential spacecraft on a closed transfer orbit that would pass close to two celestial bodies at regular intervals. Cyclers could be used for carrying heavy supplies, life support and radiation shielding.

== Concept ==
A cycler encounters two or more bodies regularly by employing a free-return trajectory. This trajectory was analysed by Arthur Schwaniger in 1963 with a symmetrical orbit past the Moon and Earth. Once the orbit is established, no propulsion is required to shuttle between the two, although some minor corrections may be necessary due to small perturbations in the orbit. The use of cyclers was considered in 1969 by Walter M. Hollister, who examined the case of an Earth–Venus cycler. Hollister did not have any particular mission in mind, but posited their use for both regular communication between two planets, and for multi-planet flyby missions.

=== Triple cycler ===
An extension of a cycler is the triple cycler like an Earth–Venus–Mars cycler, or a Jovian system moon to moon cycler.

== Types of cyclers by purpose ==
=== Venus cycler ===
Walter M. Hollister considered in 1969 the concept of a cycler and examined the case of an Earth–Venus cycler.

=== Lunar cycler ===
A lunar cycler or Earth–Moon cycler is a cycler orbit, or spacecraft therein, which periodically passes close by the Earth and the Moon, using gravity assists and occasional propellant-powered corrections to maintain its trajectories between the two. If the fuel required to reach a particular cycler orbit from both the Earth and the Moon is modest, and the travel time between the two along the cycler is reasonable, then having a spacecraft in the cycler can provide an efficient and regular method for space transportation.

=== Mars cycler ===
A Mars cycler or Earth–Mars cycler is a spacecraft trajectory that encounters the Earth and Mars on a regular basis, or a spacecraft on such a trajectory.

=== Interstellar cycler ===
An interstellar cycler or Schroeder cycler, a theoretical spacecraft trajectory that encounters two or more stars on a regular basis, or a spacecraft on such a trajectory.

An interstellar cycler would never slow down and use Lorentz force for turning. The envisioned benefit is that the life support for an interstellar vehicle wouldn't have to be accelerated, only the payload, allowing more to be carried for a given energy budget.

As an idea it was considered by P.C. Norem in a 1969 paper and popularized by Karl Schroeder in his 2002 novel Permanence.
