= Dirk Brouwer =

Dutch-American astronomer (1902–1966)

- Born: September 1, 1902; Rotterdam, Netherlands
- Died: January 31, 1966 (aged 63); New Haven, US
- Education: Leiden University
- Known for: celestial mechanics
- Awards: Gold Medal of the Royal Astronomical Society (1955); Bruce Medal (1966)
- Scientific career
- Fields: astronomy
- Doctoral advisor: Willem de Sitter
- Doctoral students: Brian G. Marsden; Jean Kovalevsky

Dirk Brouwer (Dutch pronunciation: [ˈdɪr(ə)ɡ ˈbrʌu.ər]; September 1, 1902 – January 31, 1966) was a Dutch-American astronomer.

He received his PhD in 1927 at Leiden University under Willem de Sitter and then went to Yale University. From 1941 until 1966 he was editor of the Astronomical Journal.

He specialized in celestial mechanics and together with Gerald Clemence wrote the textbook Methods of Celestial Mechanics.

== Awards ==
- Gold Medal of the Royal Astronomical Society (1955)
- Bruce Medal (1966)

== Named after him ==
- Asteroid 1746 Brouwer
- The crater Brouwer on the Moon (jointly with mathematician Luitzen Egbertus Jan Brouwer)
- Dirk Brouwer Award of the Division on Dynamical Astronomy of the American Astronomical Society
- Dirk Brouwer Award of the American Astronautical Society
