= Georgia Institute of Technology School of Computer Science =

Coordinates: 33.777524°N 84.396128°W

- Type: Public
- Established: 2007
- Chair: Vivek Sarkar
- Academic staff: 40
- Location: Atlanta, Georgia, USA

The School of Computer Science is an academic unit located within the College of Computing at the Georgia Institute of Technology (Georgia Tech). It conducts both research and teaching activities related to computer science at the undergraduate and graduate levels. These activities focus on the roots of the computing discipline, including mathematical foundations and system building principles and practices.

== History ==
The School of Computer Science was formed in February 2007, when the former Computing Science and Systems Division was renamed and promoted to "School" status. Ellen Zegura was appointed as the school's first chair. Along with its sibling academic unit, the School of Interactive Computing, the School of Computer Science represents the first time a college-level computing program has delineated the field into separate but related bodies of study. In July 2012, Lance Fortnow, formerly at Northwestern University, replaced Zegura as school chair. During Fornow's time as chair, the number of pre-tenure faculty in the school more than doubled, and the total faculty grew to 37 members. Fortnow departed his role as chair in 2019 to accept a position as Dean of Science at the Illinois Institute of Technology. Mostafa Ammar served as interim chair until Vivek Sarkar was named school chair in July 2020.

== Degrees offered ==
The School of Computer Science offers bachelor's degrees, master's degrees, and doctoral degrees in several fields. These degrees are technically granted by the School's parent organization, the Georgia Tech College of Computing, and often awarded in conjunction with other academic units within Georgia Tech.

=== Doctoral degrees ===
- Doctor of Philosophy (Ph.D.) in Computer Science
- Doctor of Philosophy (Ph.D.) in Bioengineering
- Doctor of Philosophy (Ph.D.) in Bioinformatics
- Doctor of Philosophy (Ph.D.) in Algorithms, Combinatorics & Optimization

=== Master's degrees ===
- Master of Science (M.S.) in Computer Science
- Master of Science (M.S.) in Bioengineering
- Master of Science (M.S.) in Information Security

=== Bachelor's degrees ===
- Bachelor of Science (B.S.) in Computer Science

== Notable faculty ==
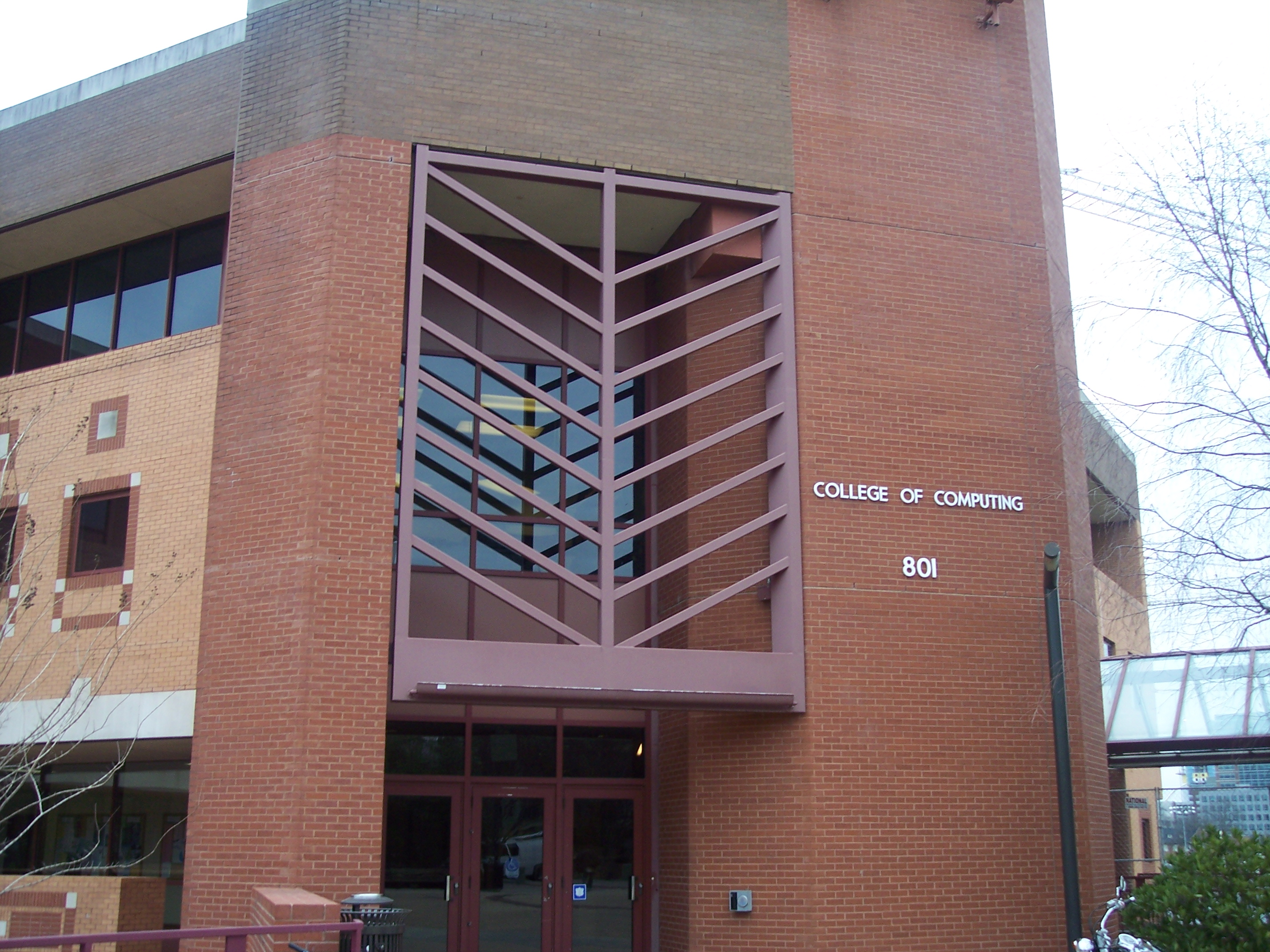
College of Computing Building

- Tom Conte
- Lance Fortnow
- Richard J. Lipton
- Ralph Merkle
- Dana Randall
- Vijay Vazirani
- Karsten Schwan
- Santosh Vempala

== Location ==
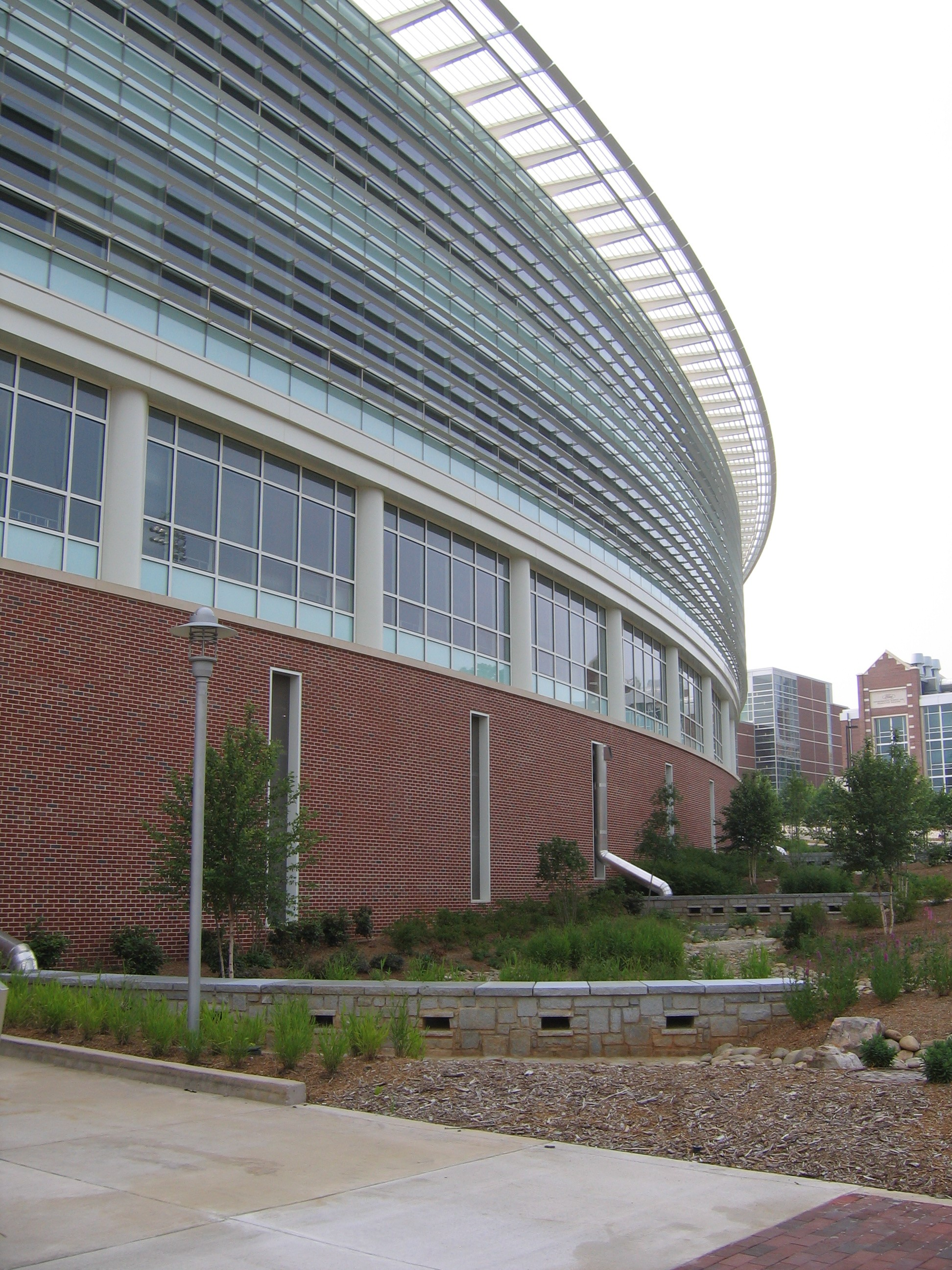
Klaus Advanced Computing Building

The School of Computer Science's administrative offices were located in the College of Computing Building on Georgia Tech's Central Campus. Additionally, many College of Computing faculty and graduate students had offices in this building until recently. In 2006, the Klaus Advanced Computing Building, donated by Georgia Tech alum Chris Klaus, was completed to provide additional offices, laboratories, and classrooms for the College of Computing. All of the School of Computer Science personnel have since moved to the second and third floor of the Klaus Building.

== See also ==
- Georgia Institute of Technology College of Computing
- GVU Center
