= Bob Davoli =

American venture capitalist

Robert "Bob" Davoli is an American venture capitalist at Gutbrain Ventures in Boston, Massachusetts.

== Education ==
Davoli obtained a history degree from Ricker College. As he considered his career options, Davoli began to study computer software by taking courses at Northeastern University.

== Career ==
In 1981, Davoli started working for Stone and Webster Engineering Corporation as a systems analyst. In 1986 he founded a database tools and consulting firm, D & N Systems, subsequently changed to SQL Solutions, with Dave Newsom. In January 1990, in Davoli's first successful high-tech exit, SQL Solutions was acquired by Sybase 18 months before they went public. Davoli stayed on to run it as a separate operating subsidiary for a year.

In 1992, Davoli was recruited to become CEO of Epoch Systems, a Sigma Partners portfolio company with a hierarchical storage management product. In 1993 Davoli sold Epoch Systems to EMC Corporation for $141 million. Davoli left Epoch / EMC about a year after the acquisition and began angel investing and advising local startups.

At about this time, Charles Ferguson had founded Vermeer Technologies which was in the process of creating FrontPage, new and innovative software for creating web pages. Ferguson was seeking out the best advisors he could find in the area and was recommended to Davoli, who joined the Vermeer board as an independent director. Vermeer was purchased by Microsoft in January 1996 for $130 million.

In 1995, Davoli was recruited to join Sigma Partners, where he became a full partner in the firm. Davoli funded some of the most successful technology companies in the mid to late 1990s. Many of these were founded by entrepreneurs from SQL Solutions and Epoch Systems. Since D & N Systems / SQL Solutions was an early strong player in the relational database field and Epoch Systems was in a similar position in hierarchical storage management, they were both natural breeding grounds from which strong startups would emerge.

In 2000, Davoli was featured as the cover story of BusinessWeek magazine for their July 24, 2000 issue, titled “How a Venture Capitalist Does It… Even in Tough Times”. The profile detailed Davoli’s investment strategy and successes, highlighting that between 1995 – 2000, Davoli-led investments of $45.5 million generated more than $2 billion in returns to Sigma Partners investors.

In 2018, Davoli founded his own investment fund Gutbrain Ventures, headquartered in Boston, MA, which currently comprises over forty investments.

Davoli has been listed five times on Forbes magazine's exclusive "Midas" list and is seen as one of the top early-stage IT venture capitalists in the United States. Past successful company exits include Dyax Corporation, Epoch Systems, LogicWorks, Dazel, Vermeer Technologies, Vignette, eDocs, Tradex, webMethods, Aprimo, Virtusa, Initiate Systems, Vlingo, Paydiant, Mobiquity, OnDot Systems, CloudHealth Technologies, Internet Security Systems, m-Qube, StorageNetworks, Octane Software, and TRADEX.

== Personal life ==
Davoli is married to Eileen McDonagh, a political science professor at Northeastern University, and they have 2 sons. They reside in the Boston, MA area. Aside from business ventures, Davoli is a singer songwriter, releasing his debut albums Wistfully Yours and Wistfully Yours: Deluxe Edition in January 2021 and March 2021, respectively. The albums comprise 36 original tunes. Since 2018, Davoli’s original music has received fourteen awards from national and international songwriting contests.

== Philanthropy ==
Bob Davoli, with his wife Eileen McDonagh, founded the Red Elm Tree Foundation in 1994. The foundation makes donations to projects involved in the arts, music education, the environment, animal welfare, health care, and public radio. Davoli served as a Trustee at the Institute of Contemporary Art, Boston from 1999 to 2020. Davoli and McDonagh were founding partners of the Berklee American Roots Music Program, at the Berklee College of Music, which began in 2008.
