= Georgia Institute of Technology - School of Electrical and Computer Engineering =

School of Electrical and Computer Engineering
- Type: Public
- Chair: Arijit Raychowdhury
- Total staff: 143
- Students: 2,543
- Location: Atlanta, Georgia, United States
- Campus: Urban
- Website: ece.gatech.edu

The School of Electrical and Computer Engineering (ECE) at the Georgia Institute of Technology, is an academic institution specializing in electrical and computer engineering education, research, and innovation. Located in Atlanta, Georgia, the school offers degree programs in Electrical engineering and Computer engineering that are accredited by ABET. It is one of the largest departments under the Georgia Institute of Technology College of Engineering.

As of 2023, the Chair of the School of ECE is Arijit Raychowdhury, Ph.D.

== Degrees offered ==
The School of ECE offers two undergraduate degrees, and eight graduate degrees.

- B.S: Computer Engineering
- B.S: Electrical Engineering
- M.S: Electrical and Computer Engineering
- M.S: Bioengineering
- M.S: Cybersecurity
- M.S: Robotics
- Ph.D: Electrical and Computer Engineering
- Ph.D: Bioengineering
- Ph.D: Machine Learning
- Ph.D: Robotics

== Enrollment and research ==
As of Fall 2023, the School of ECE reported that it had 143 staff members, and 2,543 total students. Making it one of the largest Schools of Electrical and Computer engineering in the world. The School also has over 20 research centers nationwide.

The school of ECE earned over $70,000,000 USD in research funding in fiscal year 2021.

Research areas of the School of ECE include:

- Bioengineering
- Computer Systems and Software
- Digital Signal Processing
- Electrical Energy
- Electromagnetics
- Electronic Design and Applications
- Nanotechnology
- Optics and Photonics
- Systems and Controls
- Telecommunications
- VLSI Systems and Digital Design

== Facilities ==
The School of ECE occupies eleven buildings, most of which are located in central/east campus.

- Blake R. Van Leer Electrical and Computer Engineering Building
- Joseph M. Pettit Microelectronics Research Center
- Bunger-Henry Building
- Manufacturing Research Center
- Technology Square Research Building
- Centergy One Building
- National Electric Energy Testing Research and Applications Center
- Christopher W. Klaus Advanced Computing Building
- Marcus Nanotechnology Building
- Molecular Science and Engineering Building
- Coda Building

=== International facilities ===
Additionally, the School of ECE also offers two international satellite campuses – with the largest being located at Georgia Tech Europe in Metz, France; and the second being Located at Georgia Tech Shenzhen in Shenzhen, China.
