= Georgia Institute of Technology School of Cybersecurity and Privacy =

- Type: Public
- Established: 2020
- Chair: Richard DeMillo
- Academic staff: 21
- Location: Atlanta, Georgia, USA
- Website: scp.cc.gatech.edu

The School of Cybersecurity and Privacy (SCP) is an academic unit located within the College of Computing at the Georgia Institute of Technology. This interdisciplinary unit draws its faculty from the College of Computing as well as the College of Engineering, the School of Public Policy, the Sam Nunn School of International Affairs, the Scheller College of Business, and the Georgia Tech Research Institute (GTRI). Faculty are engaged in both research and teaching activities related to computer security and privacy at the undergraduate and graduate levels. The school's unifying vision is to keep "cyberspace safer and more secure."

== History ==
The School of Cybersecurity and Privacy was founded in 2020 and Richard DeMillo was appointed as the school's founding chair. The creation of the school represented an enlargement and continuation of the vision held by the Institute for Information Security & Privacy (IISP), the former organizing locus of cybersecurity research at Georgia Tech.

== Degrees offered ==
The School of Cybersecurity and Privacy offers bachelor's degrees, master's degrees, and doctoral degrees in several fields. These degrees are technically granted by the School's parent organization, the Georgia Tech College of Computing, and often awarded in conjunction with other academic units within Georgia Tech.

Doctoral degrees

- Doctor of Philosophy (Ph.D.) in Computer Science
- Doctor of Philosophy (Ph.D.) in Electrical & Computer Engineering

Master's degrees

- Master of Science (M.S.) in Computer Science
- Master of Science (M.S.) in Cybersecurity

Bachelor's degrees

- Bachelor of Science (B.S.) in Computer Science

== Research ==
The faculty and students of the school lead and conduct a variety of research in areas including Cyber-physical systems, information security, Internet of Things (IoT), networking, and policy. Notable labs include the GTRI Cyber Technology and Information Security Laboratory (CIPHER) founded in 2010, and the Georgia Tech Information Security Center (GTISC) founded in 1998.

== Location ==
The School of Computational Science & Engineering's administrative offices, as well as those of most of its faculty and graduate students, are located in the CODA Building.

== See also ==
- Georgia Institute of Technology College of Computing
