= Georgia Institute of Technology College of Computing =

Academic department of the Georgia Institute of Technology

College of Computing
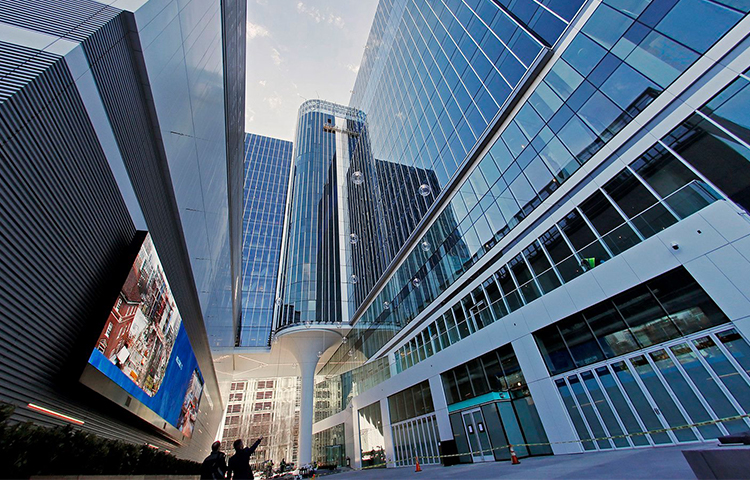
- Type: Public college
- Established: 1964/1988
- Parent institution: Georgia Institute of Technology
- Dean: Vivek Sarkar
- Faculty: 120
- Undergraduates: 4,621 (fall 2024)
- Postgraduates: 16,910 (fall 2024)
- Location: Atlanta, Georgia, United States; 33.77747°N 84.39738°W
- Website: www.cc.gatech.edu

The College of Computing is a college of the Georgia Institute of Technology, a public research university in Atlanta, Georgia. It is one of the first college-level academic units in the United States devoted primarily to the study of computing and information science. As of fall 2024 the college enrolled 4,621 undergraduates and 16,910 graduate students in computing degrees on campus and online. Its programs are regularly ranked among the top computer science and cybersecurity programs in the United States; in 2026 U.S. News & World Report listed Georgia Tech's graduate program in computer science fifth nationally, while the institute's undergraduate program in cybersecurity was ranked second. It is divided into five schools: the School of Computer Science, the School of Interactive Computing, the School of Computational Science & Engineering, the School of Cybersecurity and Privacy, and the School of Computing Instruction. The College of Computing's programs are consistently ranked among the top 10 computing programs in the nation. In 2022, U.S. News & World Report ranked the Computer Science graduate program #6 in the U.S. In 2016, Times Higher Education and the Wall Street Journal ranked the college #5 in the world.

The College of Computing has its roots in the creation of an interdisciplinary Master of Science in Information Science at Georgia Tech in 1964. The college still emphasizes an interdisciplinary focus in the structure of its degree programs, among which is a Bachelor of Science in Computational Media that is offered jointly with Georgia Tech's School of Literature, Media, and Communication in the Ivan Allen College of Liberal Arts.

== History ==
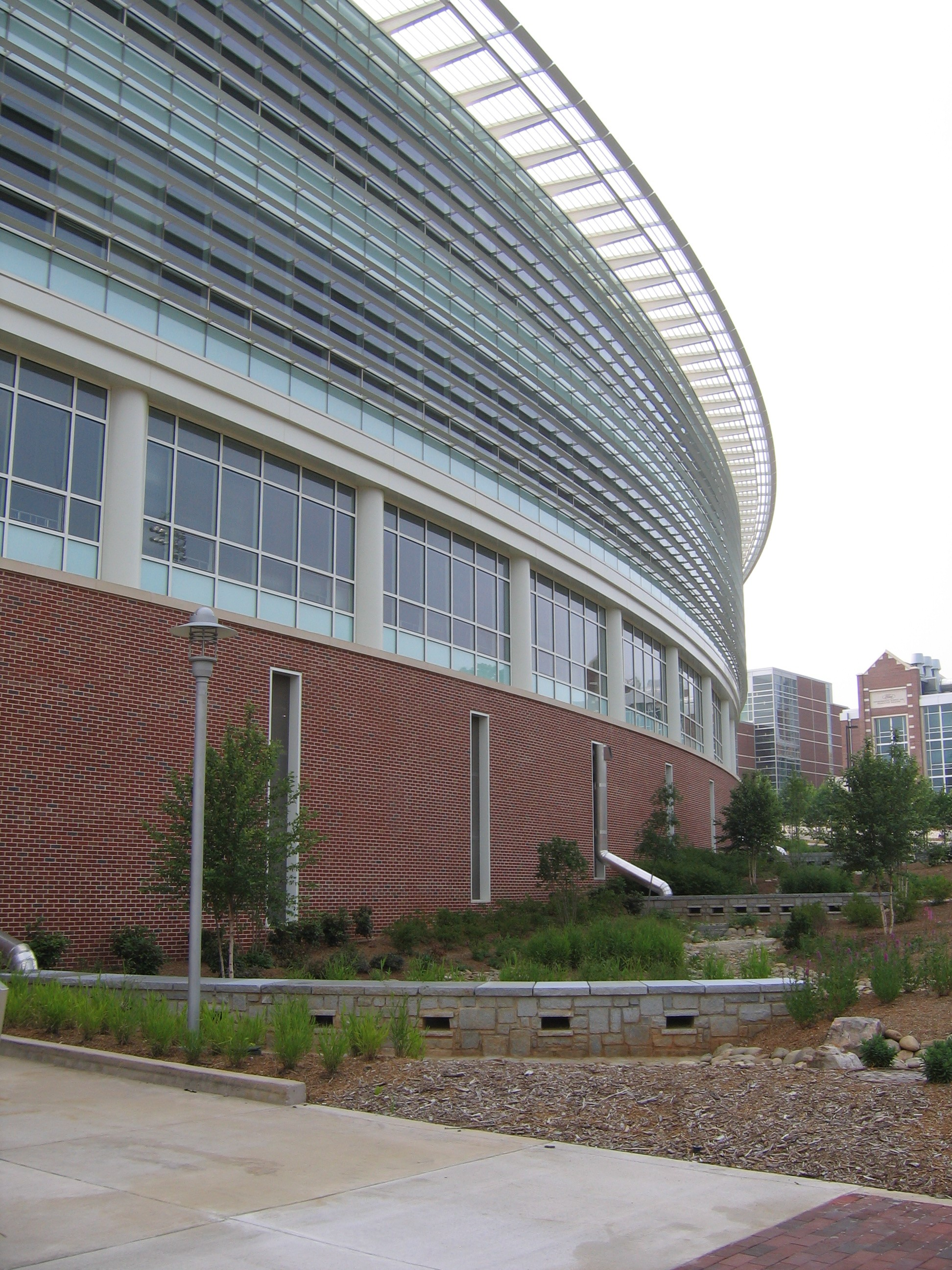
Klaus Advanced Computing Building

=== Early years ===
Georgia Tech's College of Computing traces its roots to the establishment of an Information Science degree program established in 1964. In 1963, a group of faculty members led by Dr. Vladimir Slamecka and that included Dr. Vernon Crawford, Dr. Nordiar Waldemar Ziegler, and Dr. William Atchison, noticed an interdisciplinary connection among library science, mathematics, and computer technology. The group drafted an outline for a masters-level program that would combine elements from each of these disciplines. The Georgia Tech administration accepted the plan to establish a Master of Science in Information Science which was first offered in 1964 under the School of Information Science. Dr. Slamecka, who had spearheaded the effort, was named the school's first chair.

In 1970, the school began offering a minor degree program for all Georgia Tech students, and was renamed to the School of Information and Computer Science (ICS). Two years later in 1972, ICS expanded to offer an undergraduate degree for students. It also partnered with Emory University to create a joint graduate program in Biomedical Information and Computer Science, the first partnership of its kind.

In 1979, ICS's first director and primary founder, Dr. Slamecka, retired from the position after 15 years. Dr. Ray Miller, IBM's Assistant Director of Mathematical Sciences, was hired in his place. Under Miller, the School of Information and Computer Science began a trend which began to move away from information science and towards computer science.

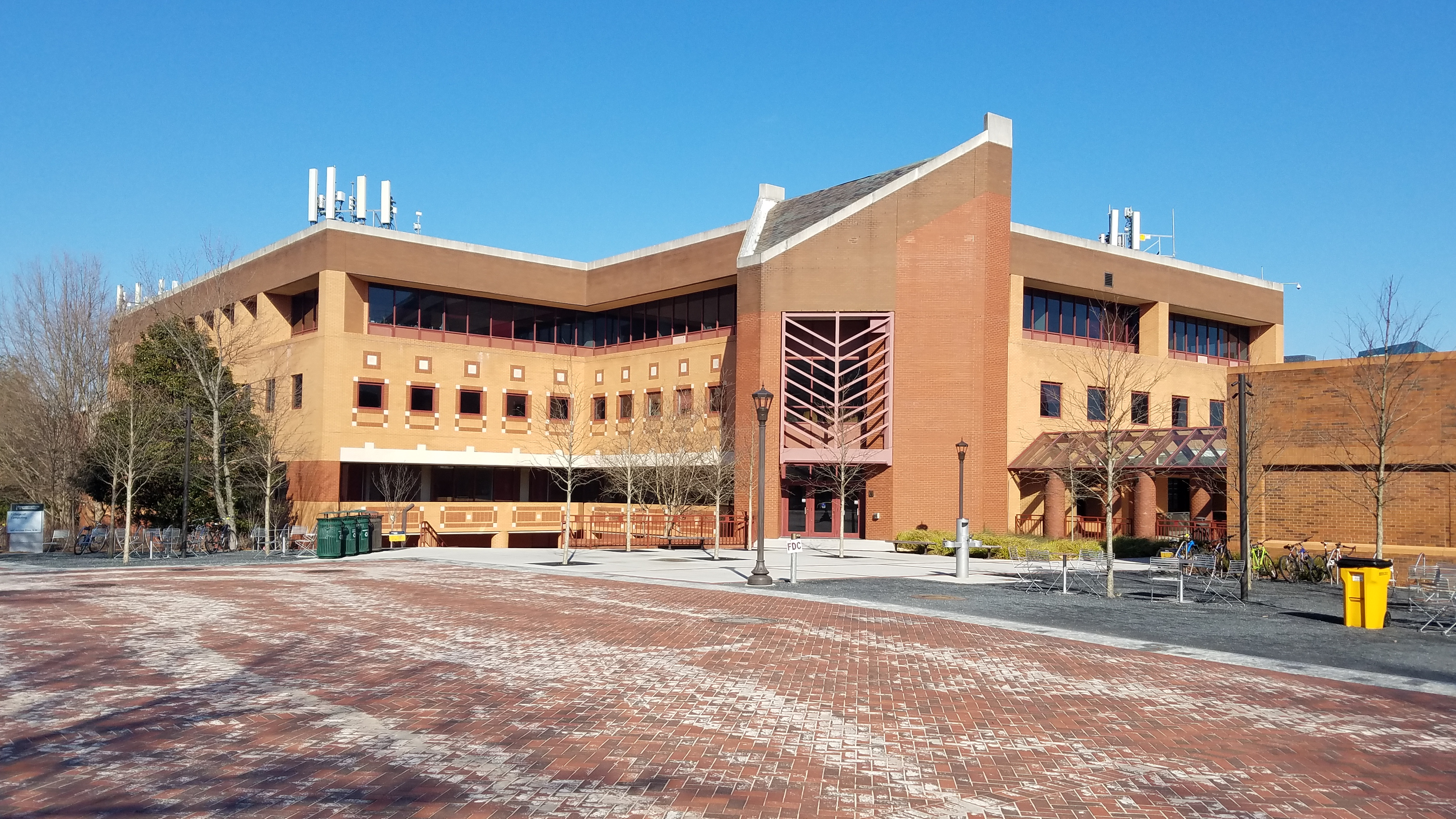
College of Computing Building

=== College ===
In John Patrick Crecine's 1988 reorganization of the institute, the School was broadened as the College of Computing, one of the school's five (and as of 1998, six) colleges. The move toward elevating the school to the status of an academic unit was partly in response to Carnegie Mellon University's creation of their School of Computer Science, and as a result, Georgia Tech was the first university in the United States to have a College of Computing. The school hired its first dean, Peter A. Freeman, in 1990, and further expanded in 2005 with more divisions.

In 2000, successful internet entrepreneur and Tech alum Chris Klaus donated $15 million towards the construction of a new building for the college. At the time of Klaus' contribution, it was the fifth-largest contribution by an individual in Georgia Tech's history. The building was officially opened on October 26, 2006.

=== Recent history ===
In February 2007, the divisions were formalized into two schools: the School of Computer Science (SCS) and the School of Interactive Computing (SIC).

In June 2008, College of Computing Dean Richard DeMillo announced plans for his resignation, citing conflicts with Georgia Tech provost and interim president Gary Schuster. DeMillo was temporarily replaced by James D. Foley, a professor in the School of Interactive Computing, until a permanent replacement could be found. On April 9, 2010, Zvi Galil was named the college's new dean.

In March 2010, the division of Computational Science & Engineering (CSE) was also formalized into a school.

The school is involved in DARPA's ADAMS project via the Proactive Discovery of Insider Threats Using Graph Analysis and Learning system.

In May 2013, the school announced that it will offer the first professional Online Master of Science degree in computer science (OMSCS) that can be earned completely through the massive online (MOOC) format in partnership with Udacity. In August 2013, US President Barack Obama praised the school as “a national leader in computer science” that is offering a master's degree in computer science “at a fraction of the cost".

In July 2019, Charles Lee Isbell Jr. took over as dean, replacing Zvi Galil.

In 2020, the School of Cybersecurity and Privacy was founded with Richard DeMillo as its founding chair.

In July 2024, Vivek Sarkar became Dean, replacing Isbell.

== Schools ==
- School of Computational Science & Engineering
- School of Computer Science
- School of Cybersecurity and Privacy
- School of Interactive Computing
- School of Computing Instruction

== Facilities ==
- CODA Building
- College of Computing Building
- Klaus Advanced Computing Building
- Technology Square Research Building

== Academics ==
The College of Computing offers the B.S., including a degree in Computational Media offered as a joint degree with the Ivan Allen College of Liberal Arts. It also offers the M.S. and Ph.D. in multiple disciplines, including several offered as joint degrees with other colleges in the university. Graduate certificates are also available.

== Rankings and selectivity ==
Georgia Tech describes the College of Computing as one of the first college-level academic units in the United States devoted primarily to computing and information science. In national surveys the college's degree programs are regularly ranked among the leading computing programs. U.S. News & World Report ranked Georgia Tech's graduate program in computer science sixth in the United States in 2022, and subsequent rankings compiled in 2026 placed the program fifth nationally. Georgia Tech's undergraduate program in cybersecurity has also been ranked second in the country by U.S. News & World Report.

Admission into computing majors at Georgia Tech is highly competitive. For the fall 2024 first-year class the Institute reported nearly 59,800 applications and about 8,250 offers of admission, an overall admit rate of roughly 12 percent across all colleges. Independent college-advising sources note that computer science is among the most popular and selective majors at Georgia Tech and is significantly more difficult to enter than the institute's overall admit rate, particularly for non-resident applicants.

== OMSCS ==
The Online Master of Science in Computer Science (OMSCS) is a degree program which has the same teaching material as MOOCs, leading to a fully accredited Masters qualification, presented in conjunction with Udacity. A contribution of $2 Million from AT&T has funded the initial development of the program as well as continuing integration of technology.

The program is designed and maintained to present a level of academic challenge entirely equivalent to a traditional MSCS course, with equivalent academic rigor as a founding principle. The estimate of the cost of studying the course is however very different; being in the region of $7,000 for a student completing the Masters course in 2 years: composed of the minimum 10 for graduation 3-credit-hour courses at $510 per course plus $301 enrollment fee per semester for say 6 semesters.

The first semester of study, in Spring 2014, some 400 students were enrolled in the program. In January 2015 some 2,000 students were enrolled in the program. As of Spring 2020, enrollment had risen to over 9,500 students, and the program has produced about 3,500 graduates to date.

Enrollment is accessible without restriction on the basis of citizenship, residence, or visa status, to students from all around the world. However, the vast majority of enrolled students are US citizens. The program does, however, mirror the gender imbalance found in many CS courses, with female students considerably outnumbered.

== Research ==
The College of Computing is the third-highest of Georgia Tech's six colleges (behind the larger and older College of Engineering and College of Sciences) in research awards, with 139 proposals worth $93,737,529 resulting in 119 awards worth $14,579,392 in 2006.

There are several organizations tied to or within the College of Computing that are primarily dedicated to research. These include several research groups and labs. Other research-related organizations include:

- GVU Center, which is primarily dedicated to computer graphics and human-computer interaction
- Center for Experimental Research in Computer Systems, which focuses on hardware aspects of computer science
- Georgia Tech Algorithms and Randomness Center ThinkTank
- Center for Research into Novel Computing Hierarchies
- Machine Learning at Georgia Tech

== Cybersecurity and Atlanta ecosystem ==
The College of Computing plays a central role in Georgia Tech's activities in information security and privacy. In 2020 the Institute created the School of Cybersecurity and Privacy within the college to coordinate degree programs and research on topics such as secure systems, cryptography, privacy engineering, and cyber-physical systems security. The college also partners closely with the Institute for Information Security & Privacy, an interdisciplinary research organization that brings together hundreds of researchers across the college, the College of Engineering, and the Georgia Tech Research Institute to work on problems such as critical infrastructure protection, secure networking, and cyber defense.

Georgia Tech's cybersecurity programs have been recognized in national rankings. In the 2023 U.S. News & World Report rankings of undergraduate cybersecurity programs the institute was ranked second in the United States, and Georgia Tech reports that its graduate level cybersecurity offerings are consistently placed among the top programs nationally.

The college's facilities in Atlanta's Midtown neighborhood form part of a larger technology corridor anchored by Technology Square and the CODA tower, which houses high performance computing resources, corporate research laboratories, and startups. Together with the Advanced Technology Development Center business incubator and several corporate innovation centers located near the college, these facilities contribute to Atlanta's emergence as a regional hub for software, cybersecurity, and financial technology companies.

== Affiliated Research Institutes ==
- Institute for People and Technology
- Institute for Robotics and Intelligent Machines
- Institute for Information Security and Privacy
- Institute for Data Engineering and Science

== Student life and community ==
The College of Computing has numerous student organizations which help build a community within the college. These organizations include:

- Anime O-Tekku
- Association for Computing Machinery
- Entertainment Software Producers
- Freshmen Mentoring Program
- Minorities @ CC
- Student Activities Board
- The FIREwall
- Undergraduate Council
- Upsilon Pi Epsilon
- Women @ CC
- Tech Entrepreneurs Society

== Alumni ==
=== Industry and entrepreneurial impact ===
Graduates and faculty affiliated with the College of Computing have been responsible for several widely used technologies and high-profile technology companies.

Computer scientist Krishna Bharat completed his M.S. and Ph.D. in computer science at Georgia Tech before joining Google, where he created the Google News automated news aggregation service. He later endowed the Krishna A. Bharat Chair in Computer Science in the College of Computing.

Several Georgia Tech alumni connected to computing have founded or led technology firms headquartered in Atlanta. Ben Chestnut, who studied industrial design at Georgia Tech, co-founded the email marketing and customer engagement company Mailchimp and served as its chief executive officer as it grew to more than 1,000 employees before its acquisition by Intuit for about $12 billion in 2021.

Other alumni whose work has had broad technical impact include D. Richard Hipp, the architect and primary author of the SQLite database engine, and researchers and entrepreneurs active in areas such as computer security, computer graphics, and large scale information systems.

Name	Class year	Notability	Reference(s)
James Allchin	1984	Former high-level executive at Microsoft	
Eric Allender	1985	Professor of computer science at Rutgers University.	
Krishna Bharat	1996	Research scientist at Google that created Google News.	
Tom Cross	1999	American entrepreneur, computer security expert, and hacker	
Richard DeMillo	1972	Former high-level executive at Hewlett-Packard and dean of the College of Computing.	
D. Richard Hipp	1984	Architect and primary author of SQLite	
Billy Hoffman	2005	American hacker; along with Virgil Griffith, discovered a security flaw in Georgia Tech's magnetic ID card system ("BuzzCard") and was sued by BuzzCard maker Blackboard Inc.	
Paul Q. Judge	2002	Entrepreneur and technical expert	
Craig Mundie	1972	Chief research and strategy officer at Microsoft	
James F. O'Brien	2000	Professor of Computer Science at University of California, Berkeley	
Rosalind Picard	1984	Founder and director of the Affective Computing Research Group at the Massachusetts Institute of Technology	
Mike Pinkerton	1997	American software developer working on the Mozilla browsers. He lectures on Development of Open Source Software at George Washington University	
Gene Spafford	1981	Professor of computer science at Purdue University and a leading computer security expert	
Jeff Trinkle	1979	Professor and Chair of Computer Science at Rensselaer Polytechnic Institute in Troy, New York	
Shwetak Patel	2003 (BS), 2008 (PhD)	WRF Endowed Professor of Computer Science & Engineering and Electrical Engineering at University of Washington in Seattle, WA	

== See also ==
- GVU Center
- Institute for Personal Robots in Education
- Sony Toshiba IBM Center of Competence for the Cell Processor
- Center for Robotics and Intelligent Machines
