= Klaus Advanced Computing Building =

Coordinates: 33.777524°N 84.396128°W

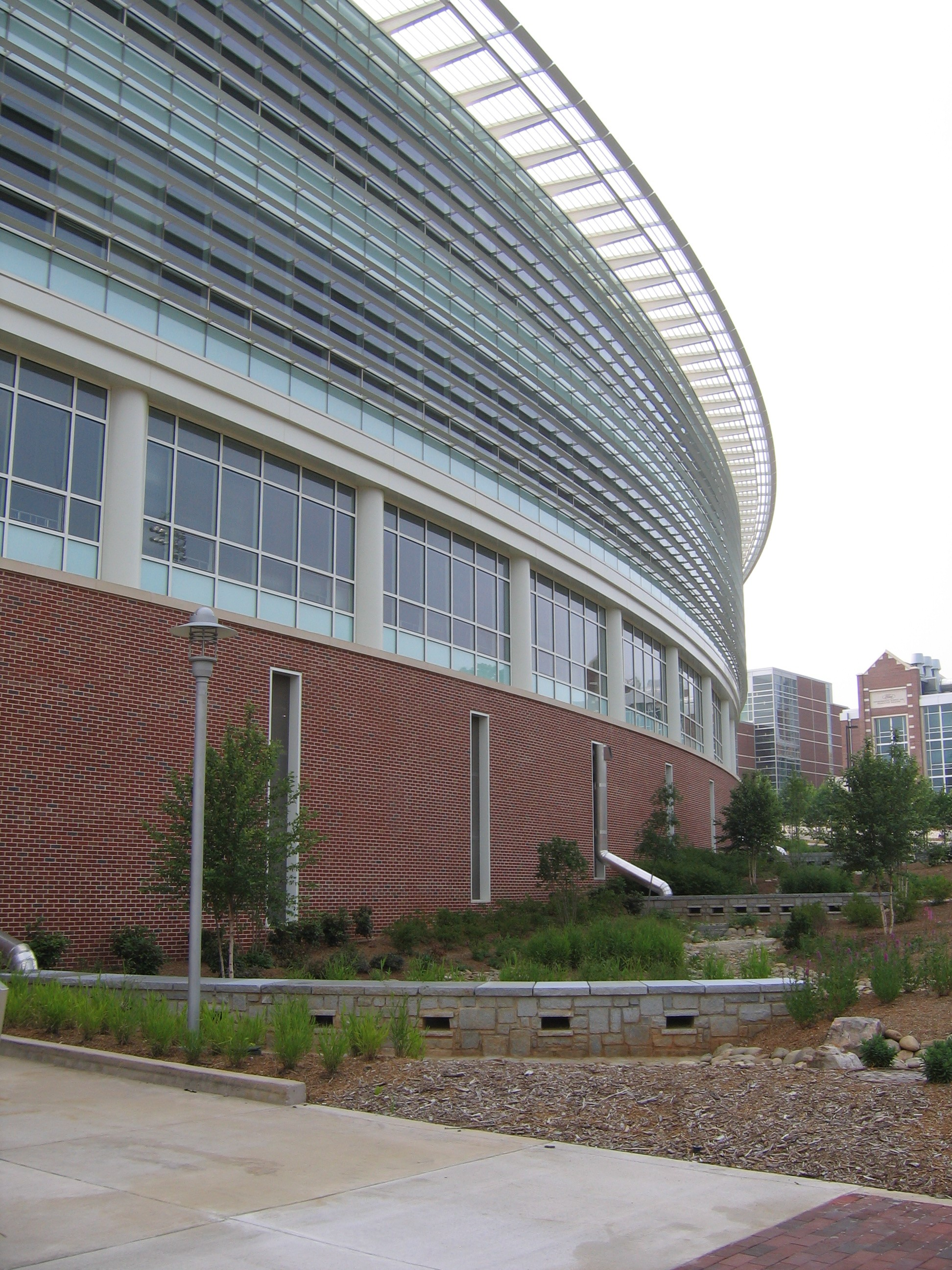
- The Klaus Advanced Computing Building, as seen from the southeast
- Interactive map of the Klaus Advanced Computing Building area

General information
- Type: Academic
- Location: Atlanta, Georgia, 266 Ferst Dr Atlanta, GA 30332
- Owner: University System of Georgia

Technical details
- Floor count: 3
- Floor area: 414,000 square feet (38,500 m^{2})

Design and construction
- Awards: Gold LEED Certified

The Christopher W. Klaus Advanced Computing Building is a three-story academic building at the Georgia Institute of Technology that houses a portion of its College of Computing, College of Engineering, and related programs.

== History ==
=== Financing ===
In 2000, the building was financed by a $15 million donation from successful internet entrepreneur and former Georgia Tech student Chris Klaus. Klaus was a founder of both Kaneva and Internet Security Systems. At the time of Klaus' contribution, it was the fifth-largest contribution by an individual in Georgia Tech's history. Klaus was 26 when he made the donation.

=== Planning ===
Architect Perkins+Will was selected. The site of the old Health Center was selected for the new computing building's location, and a new $7.1 million Health Center was built near the Georgia Tech Campus Recreation Center to free up that land. The Health Center faculty were then moved to the new facility in March 2003. Construction was initially planned to start in Summer 2003, but there was some difficulty in the ownership of the many parcels that the site encompassed. Several were of uncertain ownership, and Georgia Tech had to verify that it owned every part of the site before the Georgia Board of Regents would allow construction to proceed.

[I]f you look at some old maps, way, way back when [Tech] was just a few buildings, these [parcels] were all home sites ... Before the Board of Regents will allow anyone to build on a site, they have to have the deed in hand and know that the property belongs to the Board of Regents ... That was a major, major issue for us ... [W]e literally had to go through [each parcel] with the city and everybody else trying to reconcile who's the owner.

Construction bids were set in December 2003, and the winning contractor was scheduled to begin in early January. General contractors WG Yates & Sons Construction received permission from the state to occupy the site in February 2004. From that date, the project was expected to take two years to complete.

=== Construction ===
There was a "Virtual Ground Breaking" ceremony on April 1, 2004 that featured a 3d virtual tour of the building. Construction was then delayed somewhat by a rainy summer and a large amount of subsurface rock; the latter required the use of explosives to clear.

Students who attended classes in the summer felt frequent tremors in the College of Computing as the explosives were set off ... [Construction project manager Ron] Leroy's team sent out email notices and conducted meetings with faculty who would be affected by the blasts, but they still had a disruptive effect on classes in the area.

Crews closed in the building in Summer 2005. The building was officially opened on October 26, 2006.

== Features ==
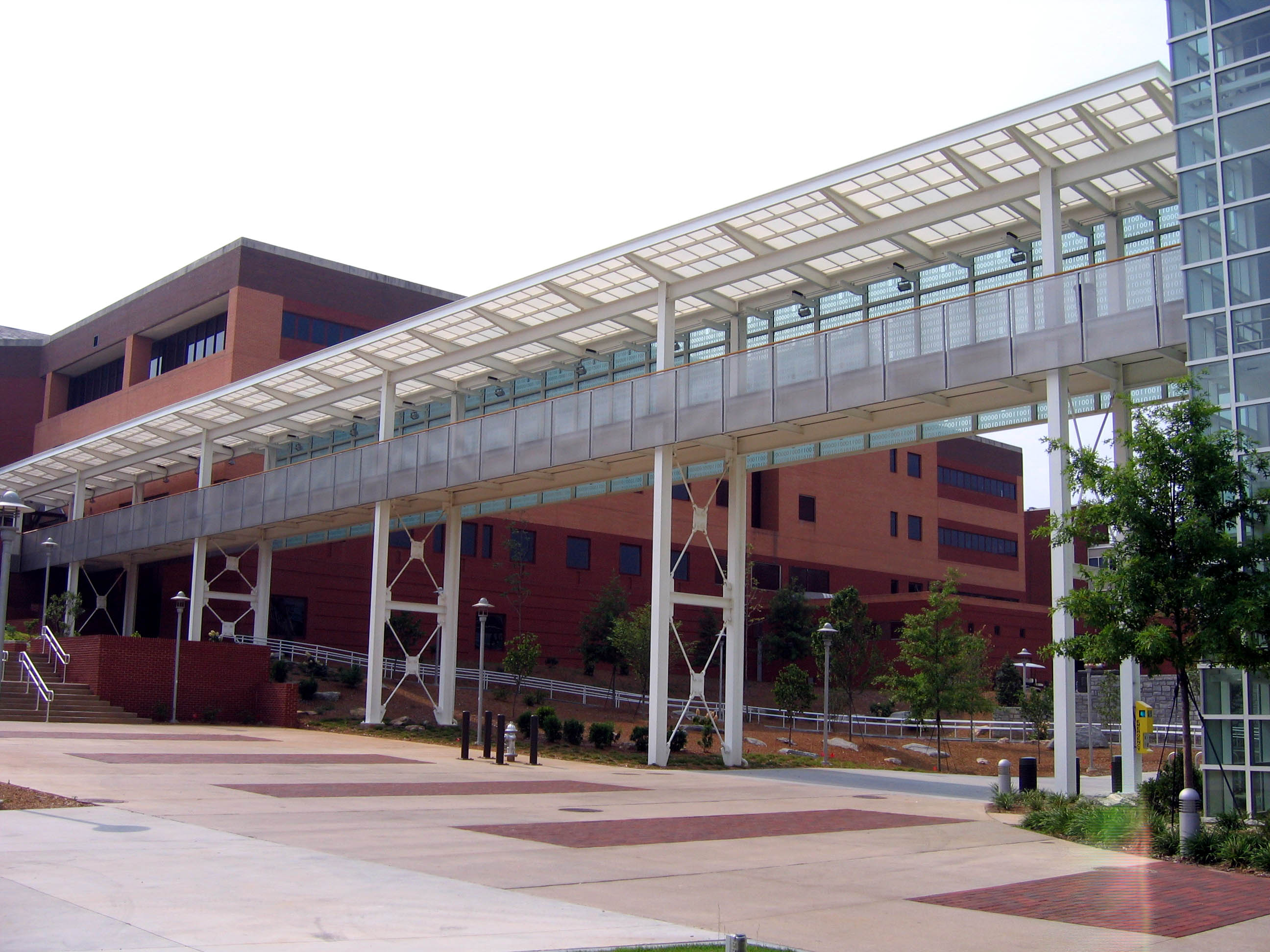
The "Binary Bridge," so called because of the 1s and 0s on the glass. It is a pedestrian bridge that links the third floor of the Klaus building to the College of Computing Building.

The building has 414,000 square feet (38,500 m^{2}) of space and more than 70 laboratories. There is a three-story parking deck beneath the facility that holds 534 vehicles in order to minimize the number of surface lots on campus, and an open pathway through the center of the building that facilitates pedestrian traffic that would otherwise go around the building.

It has been cited as environmentally friendly, and earned the United States Green Building Council's Leadership in Energy and Environmental Design (LEED) Gold Certification. Several of those features include extensive green space (over 50 percent of the 6-acre (24,000 m^{2}) site), a storm water collection system that provides water for irrigation, energy efficient heating and cooling systems, waterless urinals, and extensive use of recyclables.

== Occupants ==
The building is home to the College of Computing's School of Computer Science and its School of Computational Science and Engineering, three research centers (GTISC, CERCS and ARC), and over 20 College of Computing Research Labs. It also houses much of the School of Electrical Engineering's computer engineering faculty and support staff.
