= Georgia Tech Online Master of Science in Computer Science =

Master of Science degree in Computer Science at Georgia Tech

- Type: Distance education
- Established: May 13, 2013
- Parent institution: Georgia Tech College of Computing
- Academic staff: David Joyner
- Students: 18,962
- Location: Atlanta, Georgia
- Website: omscs.gatech.edu

Georgia Tech Online Master of Science in Computer Science (OMSCS) is a Master of Science degree offered by the College of Computing at Georgia Tech. The program was launched in 2014 in partnership with Udacity and AT&T and delivered through the massive open online course (MOOC) format. Georgia Tech has received attention for offering an online master's degree program for under $7,000 that gives students from all over the world the opportunity to enroll in a top 10-ranked computer science program. The program has been recognized by the University Professional and Continuing Education Association, Fast Company, and the Reimagine Education Awards for excellence and innovation.

== Background ==
The College of Computing at the Georgia Institute of Technology launched its online Master of Science in Computer Science degree in January 2014. The program was conceived by former Dean of Computing Zvi Galil and Udacity founder Sebastian Thrun. OMSCS is delivered through the massive open online course format and is designed to deliver instructional content and academic support via the massive open online course format. The former Dean of the College of Computing, Charles Isbell, helped lead the effort to launch the program as then-senior associate dean.

As of Spring 2025, the program has 16,609 enrolled students. It admits all applicants deemed to possess a reasonable chance of success—about 74% of the approximately 50,000 applicants to date—which is significantly higher than the university's on-campus graduate admissions rate. From its creation in 2014 until the end of the Fall 2024, the program has graduated over 13,000 students with 1,056 degrees awarded in Fall 2024. Research by David Joyner & Charles Isbell found that applications to the on-campus program tripled after the launch of the online program. They also found the program is predominantly populated by domestic students, although the ratio of international students has been growing, and the program enrolls a higher rate of underrepresented minorities than the on-campus program.

The program has received significant media attention since its announcement in May 2013, including a front-page story in The New York Times and a segment on the PBS NewsHour series "Rethinking Education".

== Curriculum and culture ==
As of Spring 2023, the online master's program currently offers 58 courses and six specializations—Computational Perception and Robotics, Computer Graphics, Computing Systems, Human-Computer Interaction, Artificial Intelligence, and Machine Learning.

A study entitled “Can Online Delivery Increase Access to Education,” by John F. Kennedy School of Government at Harvard University Associate Professor Joshua Goodman, Ivan Allen College of Liberal Arts at the Georgia Institute of Technology Associate Professor Julia Melkers, and Harvard Faculty of Arts and Sciences Associate Professor Amanda Pallais, explored the structure and industry impact of the online master's program and concluded that it supplies the need of “a vast untapped market for highly affordable degrees from prestigious colleges.”

Research published at the 2019 ACM Global Computing Education Conference noted that part of the reason for the program's success is the alignment between platform and content. The professors, instructors, teaching assistants, and students in the program are uniquely qualified as CS students to contribute to the platforms used to produce and deliver the program.

Due to the online format of the program, social media has played a significant role in the development of robust student communities. The utilizes an artificial intelligence teaching assistant called Jill Watson, built using IBM's Watson platform. Jill is able to answer questions posed in natural language and assists students enrolled in the program's Knowledge-Based Artificial Intelligence course, led by Professor Ashok Goel. Jill has since been adapted for use in non-computer science courses, as well.

To further reduce the load on human instructors and teaching assistance, as well as prevent duplicated effort on the part of students, the program uses the Piazza Automated Related Question Recommender, or PARQR, which suggests relevant existing posts as a student composes a new post. Created by a team led by Thad Starner, a professor in the School of Interactive Computing, and implemented in his Introduction to Artificial Intelligence OMSCS course, the tool has reduced duplicate posts by 40% and recommends relevant posts 73.5% of the time.

The program has also introduced an artificial intelligence agent known as Jack Watson that monitors homework-for-hire sites for postings from OMSCS courses. When “hired” by a student, Jack provides a watermarked solution that can be automatically recognized once submitted by the student. Created by a team led by Thad Starner, Jack Watson has had success in identifying course submissions that are not original work.

== Recognition and impact ==
Former President Barack Obama publicly praised Georgia Tech's online master's program on two occasions, as providing a model to both address the STEM worker shortage and control the costs of higher education. The program was the recipient of University Professional and Continuing Education Association’s Outstanding Program Award in the credit category. OMSCS was also cited as the reason Georgia Tech was named to Fast Company’s 2017 list of Most Innovative Companies in the World—the third university so named and the first for work in the education sector. In 2019, the program received the gold award for the best distributed/online program for nurturing 21st-century skills at the Reimagine Education Conference & Awards. In July 2020, in her popular newsletter, Dr. Barbara Oakley called the program "the most significant leap forward in higher education of recent decades". In December 2020, OMSCS was featured in an interview Zvi Galil gave to Academic Influence. In April 2021, The Wall Street Journal reported on the program's success, naming Galil "the man who made online college work", and the magazine of the Marconi Society featured OMSCS. In July 2021, OMSCS was featured by Forbes and by a Wiley podcast.

=== Other online degrees in Georgia Tech ===
The program has proved to be a model for other online degrees. Georgia Tech itself has launched two additional online master's degrees which offer courses cross-listed with OMSCS: one in Analytics and one in Cybersecurity. The online master's initiative has spurred Georgia Tech to adapt several undergraduate Computer Science courses to MOOC courses, including Introduction to Python Programming, Introduction to Object-Oriented Programming with Java, and Data Structures & Algorithms.

=== Similar initiatives ===
Other universities have followed suit with more affordable MOOC-based online master programs, starting with the iMBA program at the University of Illinois. So far, more than 30 universities have followed in the footsteps of Georgia Tech, creating over 70 such programs.
