= ASDL =

ASDL may stand for:

- Analytical Sciences Digital Library, one of several digital libraries in the US National Science Digital Library
- Aeronautical satellite data link, an aeronautical abbreviation
- Aerospace Systems Design Lab of Georgia Institute of Technology - Daniel Guggenheim School of Aerospace Engineering
- Amsterdam Lelylaan station, station code Asdl
- Abstract Syntax Description Language, a language designed to describe the tree-like data structures in compilers which is used in Python

== See also ==
- ADSL (Asymmetric digital subscriber line)
