= OMSA =

The initialism OMSA may stand for:

- Ogden Museum of Southern Art
- OpenManage Server Administrator, a component of Dell Computer's OpenManage monitoring and management product for servers
- Online Master of Science in Analytics in Georgia Institute of Technology
- Otago Malaysian Students' Association
