= James Mallet =

Evolutionary biologist

James Mallet (born 15 March 1955 in London) is an evolutionary zoologist specialising in entomology.

He was educated at Winchester College. He became professor of biological diversity at the Department of Biology, University College London. He was co-director of the Centre for Ecology and Evolution, a centre of excellence in research and teaching formed by University College London, the Institute of Zoology (Zoological Society of London), Natural History Museum, Imperial College, Queen Mary, Royal Holloway and Kew Gardens. In 2013 he was distinguished lecturer on Organismic and Evolutionary Biology at Harvard University. His research has included work on the species concept central to evolutionary biology, along with hybridization and the process of speciation.

He was awarded the Darwin-Wallace Medal by the Linnean Society of London in 2008.

His wife, Hopi Hoekstra, an evolutionary biologist, became dean of Harvard Faculty of Arts and Sciences in August 2023.
