= Richard DeMillo =

American computer scientist, educator and executive

Richard Allan DeMillo
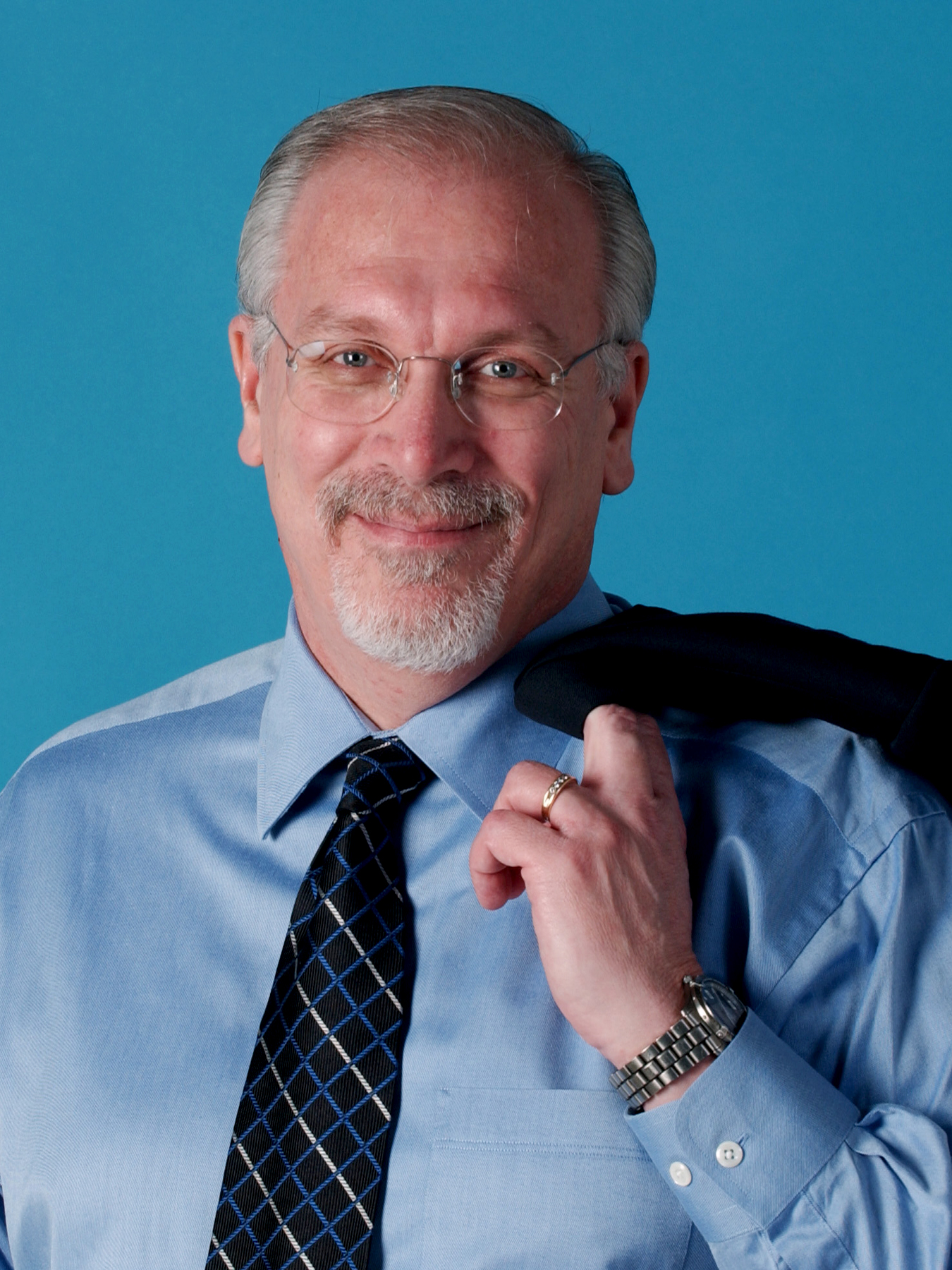
- Born: January 26, 1947 (age 79); Hibbing, Minnesota
- Education: University of St. Thomas; Georgia Institute of Technology
- Scientific career
- Fields: Computer security, software engineering, and mathematics
- Doctoral advisor: Lucio Chiaraviglio
- Doctoral students: Jeff Offutt

Richard Allan DeMillo (born January 26, 1947) is an American computer scientist, educator and executive. He is Professor and holds the Charlotte B. and Roger C. Warren Chair in Computing at the Georgia Institute of Technology.

In 2009, he stepped down as the John P. Imlay Dean of Computing at Georgia Tech after serving in that role for seven years. After founding and for ten years directing Georgia Tech's Center for 21st Century Universities, a living laboratory for fundamental change in higher education, he founded and served as the interim Chair of the School of Cybersecurity and Privacy in the College of Computing .

He joined Georgia Tech in 2002 from The Hewlett-Packard Company, where he had served as the company's first Chief Technology Officer. He also held executive positions with Telcordia Technologies (formerly known as Bell Communications Research) and the National Science Foundation. He is a well-known researcher and author of over 100 articles, books and patents in the areas of computer security, software engineering, and mathematics.

== Early life and education ==
A Minnesota native, Richard DeMillo was born and raised in Hibbing, Minnesota and received his Bachelor of Arts in mathematics from the University of St. Thomas in St. Paul Minnesota in 1969 and a Ph.D. in information and computer science from Georgia Tech in 1972.

== Early career ==
His first academic appointment was at the University of Wisconsin–Milwaukee, but in 1976 he returned to Georgia Tech as an Associate Professor of Information and Computer Science, where he established a long-term collaboration with Richard Lipton. This collaboration led to a ground-breaking analysis of formal methods in computer science, the establishment of a new method for software testing, called Program Mutation among other results. In 1977, he collaborated with Lawrence Landweber to create THEORYNET, an early store-and-forward computer network that was the predecessor of NSFNet, a network that was ultimately absorbed by the Internet and managed by NSF until 1989.

From 1981 to 1987 DeMillo was the Director of the Software Test and Evaluation Project for the US Department of Defense (DoD). He is widely credited with developing the DoD's policy for test and evaluation of software-intensive systems. In 1987, he moved to Purdue University where he was named Professor of Computer Science and Director of The Software Engineering Research Center. In 1989, he became Director of the National Science Foundation Computer and Computation Research Division and presided over the growth of high performance computing and computational science programs. He also held a visiting professorship at the University of Padua in Padua, Italy where he led the formation of a successful post-graduate program in software engineering.

In 1995 he became vice president and general manager of information and computer science research at Bellcore (which later became Telcordia Technologies), leading the invention of new technologies for e-commerce, networking and communications. In 1997, he collaborated with Richard Lipton and Daniel Boneh to create the “Differential Fault Analysis” method of cryptanalysis, leading to a strengthening of existing standards for internet security.

In 2000, DeMillo joined Hewlett-Packard (HP) as vice president and Chief Technology Officer (CTO). While working at HP, he led the company's introduction of a new processor architecture, a corporate trust and security strategy, and the company's entry into open source software. He was the public spokesman for HP's technology and one of the most visible figures in IT. In 2002, RSA Security appointed DeMillo to its board of directors, a position he held until 2007 when RSA was acquired by EMC. He remained at HP through the company's 2002 merger with Compaq computer and was named Vice President for Technology Strategy. He returned to Tech that August to serve as the new dean of the College of Computing.

== Georgia Tech ==
Arriving in 2002, DeMillo replaced Peter A. Freeman as Dean of the Georgia Tech College of Computing and led the college to a period of aggressive growth at a time when Computer Science enrollments were in decline nationally. He led the formation of 3 new schools, 7 new degree programs, 3 international programs, and 2 research centers. Under his tenure the ranking of Georgia Tech's graduate computer science programs rose from 14 to 9. He incorporated a broader focus into the College's undergraduate programs and launched a new program called "Threads", a student-centered approach to undergraduate education that has influenced computer science programs nationally and internationally.

DeMillo was honored as an ACM Fellow in 2003 for "contributions to the engineering of reliable and secure software." In 2004, he was also honored as an AAAS Fellow.

In June 2008, shortly after long-time Georgia Tech President Wayne Clough stepped down to become Secretary of the Smithsonian Institution, DeMillo announced his resignation as Dean of the College of Computing. In 2010, he founded the Center for 21st Century Universities (C21U). In recognition of C21U as a "unique institution", the Lumina Foundation named him a Fellow in 2013.

In 2011, his book Abelard to Apple: The Fate of American Colleges and Universities was published by MIT press and became the basis for the formation of a center dedicated to experimentation in higher education. He became a national leader in the online education revolution, and a sequel entitled "Revolution in Higher Education: How a Small Band of Innovators Will Make College Accessible and Affordable: was published by MIT Press in 2015 and in 2016 was named best Education book by the American Publishers Association.

In 2016, he was given the ANAK Society's award, which is granted annually to an outstanding Georgia Tech faculty member, and is considered the most prestigious award of its kind.

in September 2020, he launched and served as first chair of Georgia Tech's School of Cybersecurity and Privacy, the first academic unit of its kind at a major research university.
