= Mitchell L.R. Walker =

Aerospace Engineer

Mitchell Louis Ronald Walker II (born July 18, 1977) is an American aerospace engineer, researcher, and educator. As of January 1, 2024, he is the chair of the Daniel Guggenheim School of Aerospace Engineering (AE) in the College of Engineering at the Georgia Institute of Technology. Prior to serving as the chair, he was the associate dean for academic affairs at the Georgia Tech College of Engineering. He is the founder and director of the High-Power Electric Propulsion Laboratory (HPEPL) at Georgia Tech, founded in 2005. The lab aims to advance the understanding of plasma physics and expand the technology of electric propulsion devices for future space use.

He has served on the National Research Council Reusable Booster System Committee, the NASA Advisory Council Technology, Innovation, and Engineering Committee, the U.S. Department of Energy, Office of Science Fusion Energy Sciences Advisory Committee (FESAC) and the National Academies of Sciences Engineering Medicine, Committee to Review the Air Force Reusable Booster System Study.

Walker has authored over 100 scientific journal articles and conference papers in electric propulsion and plasma physics. In addition, he serves as an associate editor of the American Institute of Aeronautics and Astronautics (AIAA) Journal of Spacecraft and Rockets. Walker is also on the editorial board of the Journal of Electric Propulsion and Frontiers in Physics and Astronomy and Space Sciences-Plasma Physics.

== Early life and education ==
Walker was born in Alma, Michigan, but grew up in Cassopolis, Michigan, a lakeside community on the southwest side of the state.

He earned his B.S.E. in aerospace engineering in 1999, M.S. in aerospace engineering in 2000, and Ph.D. in aerospace engineering in 2005 from the University of Michigan.

== Career ==
Walker joined the faculty at Georgia Tech in AE as an assistant professor in 2005. He became an associate professor in 2011 and a full professor in 2017. In two years, he became the associate chair for graduate programs, where he served for four years. Walker is the principal investigator and director of the Joint Advanced Propulsion Institute (JANUS), NASA's Space Technology Research Institute, which develops strategies and methodologies to overcome limitations in ground testing of high-power electric propulsion systems. The $15 million project includes 11 partner universities and 17 researchers. In 2022, he served as the associate dean for academic affairs for the Georgia Tech College of Engineering. In January 2024, he became the chair of the highly ranked AE School.

Walker's primary research interests focus on electric propulsion, plasma physics, and hypersonic aerodynamics/plasma interaction. He has worked in the development of Hall thrusters and ion engines. Walker has done relevant research in the areas of Hall thruster clustering, vacuum chamber facility effects, particle-material interactions, and electronic emission from carbon nanotubes. His research involves theoretical and experimental work in advanced spacecraft propulsion systems, diagnostics (including THz time-domain spectroscopy and Thomson scattering), plasma physics, helicon plasma sources, magnetoplasmadynamic thrusters, and pulsed inductive thrusters.

== Patents ==
- US Patent No. 10,823,158, “Deployable Gridded Ion Thruster,” Authors: Walker, M. L. R., Cheong, C., Filed February 19, 2019, Issued: November 3, 2020.
- U.S. Patent No. 8,604,681, “Cold Cathodes and Ion Thrusters and Methods of Making and Using Same,” Authors: M. L. R. Walker, W. J. Ready, Filed March 2009, Issued December 10, 2013.
