= Vijaya Ramachandran =

American computer scientist

Vijaya Ramachandran is an Indian-American theoretical computer scientist known for her research on graph algorithms and parallel algorithms. She is the William Blakemore II Regents Professor of Computer Sciences at the University of Texas at Austin.

== Education and career ==
Ramachandran earned her Ph.D. in 1983 from Princeton University, with a dissertation Studies in VLSI Layout and Simulation supervised by Richard Lipton.

She joined the department of electrical and computer engineering at the University of Illinois Urbana-Champaign as an assistant professor in 1983, and moved to the University of Texas at Austin in 1989. She was named the William Blakemore II Regents Professor in 1995.

== Recognition ==
In 2013, the University of Delhi named Ramachandran as an honorary professor.
