= Chris Klaus =

American technology entrepreneur (born 1973)

Christopher W. Klaus
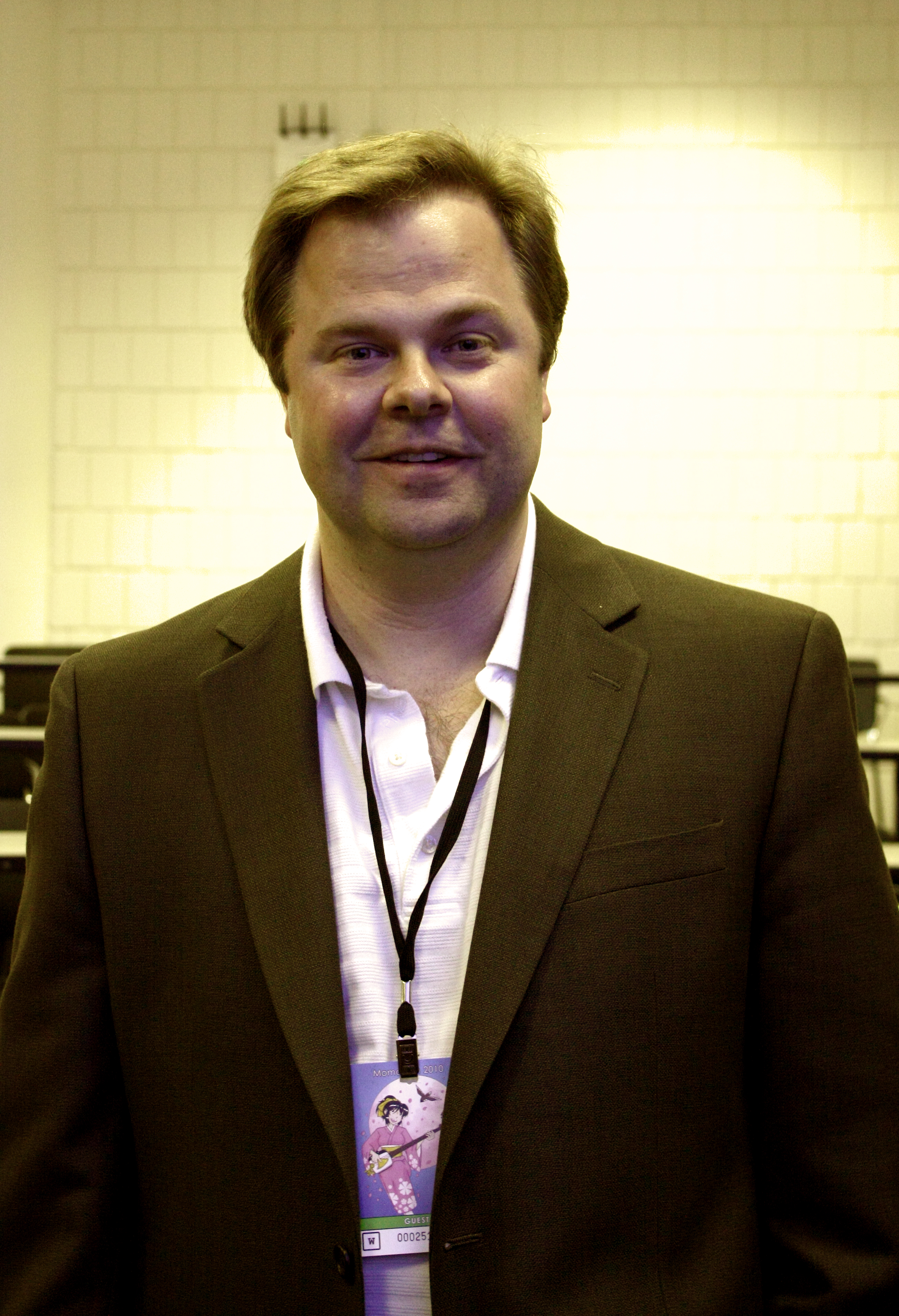
- Chris Klaus, 2010
- Born: 1973 (age 52–53); Sarasota, Florida, U.S.
- Occupations: Founder and CEO of Kaneva, Investor
- Spouse: Crissy Klaus (m. 2003; div. 2018)
- Children: Will Klaus Christian Klaus

Christopher W. Klaus (born 1973 in Sarasota, Florida) is an American technology entrepreneur. He was founder and CTO of Internet Security Systems (ISS), a company which he started in the early 1990s, and then sold to IBM in 2006 for $1.3B.

He also holds the honor of being the namesake of the Klaus Advanced Computing Building at the Georgia Institute of Technology.

== History ==
Klaus formed ISS in the early 1990s as a student at the Georgia Institute of Technology, eventually dropping out to focus on the growing company. In 2004 he stepped down from his role of Chief Technology Officer of ISS to pursue other interests, although he remained a significant shareholder and retained his role as the company's Chief Security Advisor. In 2006 ISS was sold to IBM for $1.3B.

Around 2007 Klaus became one of Georgia Tech's most visible contributors, giving a $15M naming gift to build the College of Computing's new home, the Klaus Advanced Computing Building.

In July 2014, Klaus co-founded NeuroLaunch, a business accelerator focused towards neurotech companies in Atlanta. In October 2015, he financed and co-founded another accelerator, CyberLaunch, which focuses on cybersecurity and machine learning startups.

During 2016 he was the CEO of Kaneva, a game company which he founded in 2004, and also the main financier for multiple business accelerators in the Atlanta area; including being a part of the Atlanta Technology Angels.

In Spring of 2024 Klaus was supposed to deliver the commencement speech for the Class of 2024 students at the Georgia Institute of Technology obtaining their Bachelors from the College of Computing and Masters from the College of Engineering. However, he was unable to attend due to the passing of his son, Will, and had his friend Karl Dasher give the address instead.

Klaus gave the commencement address the following year, telling his entrepreneurship story and receiving an honorary doctorate from the Institute presented by President Ángel Cabrera. He concluded his speech by remembering his son, Will, and gifting all graduating students of the Class of 2025 the opportunity to incorporate a Delaware C Corporation at his expense in Will's honor.
