= Harvard Division of Continuing Education =

Academic department of Harvard University

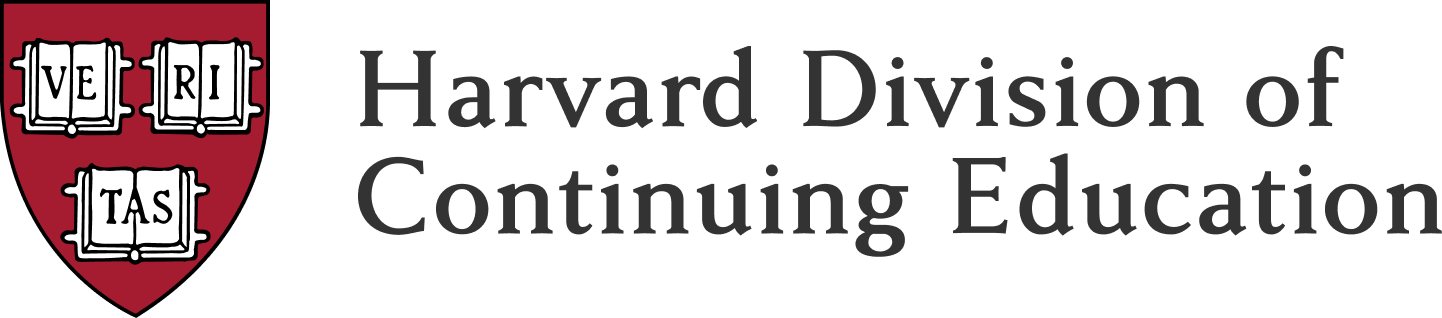
- Division of Continuing Education
- Type: Private
- Dean: Nancy Coleman
- Location: Cambridge, Massachusetts, United States
- Campus: Urban
- Website: dce.harvard.edu

The Harvard Division of Continuing Education is a division within the Faculty of Arts and Sciences at Harvard University. It offers four programs: Extension School, Summer School, Professional & Executive Development, and Harvard Institute for Learning in Retirement.

== Programs ==
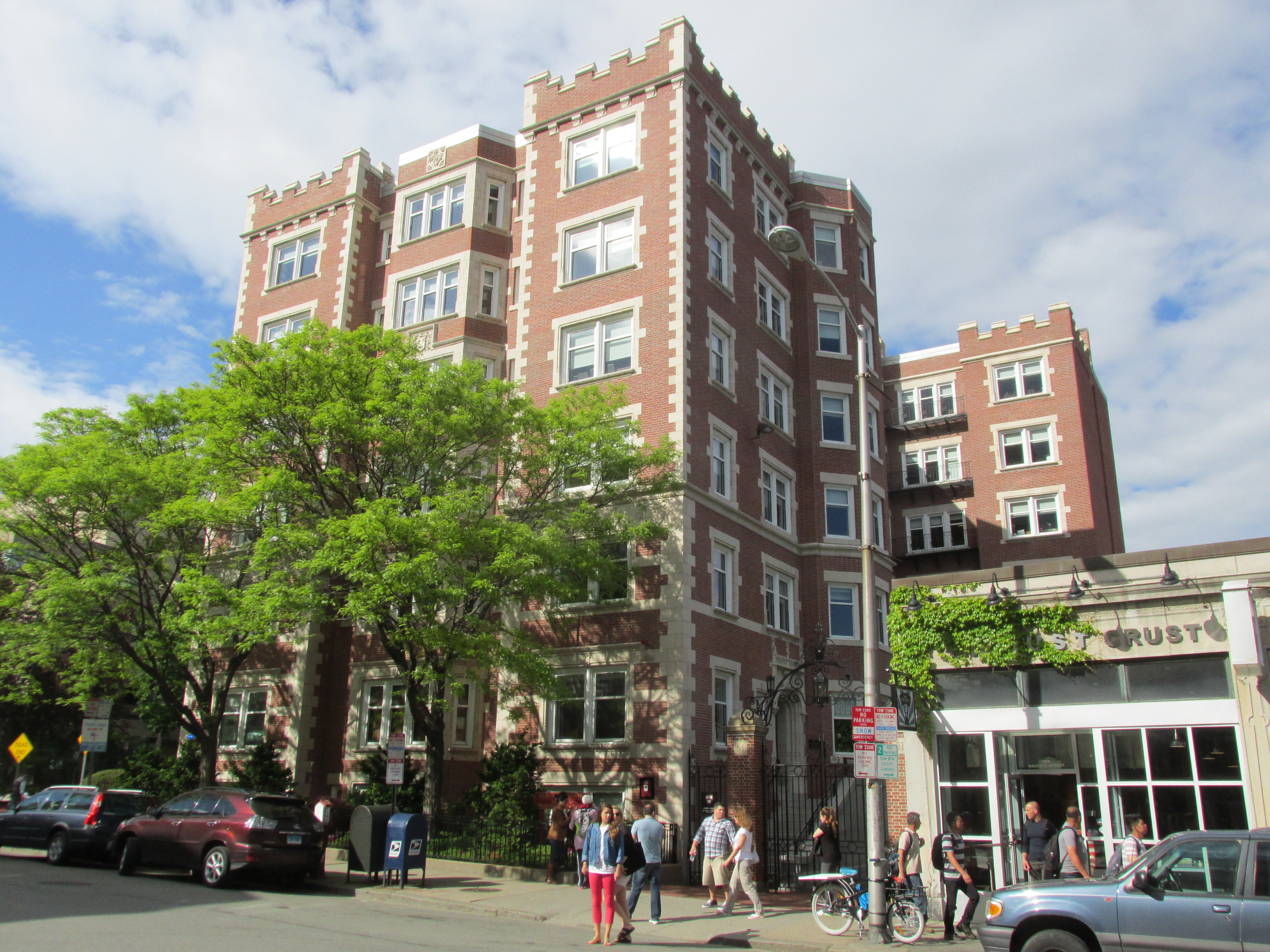
The Harvard Extension School building

Harvard Extension School, founded in 1910, offers online and on-campus education for nontraditional students through open-enrollment for individual courses, part-time day and evening classes, and opportunities for personal enrichment or career advancement, including offering undergraduate certificates and graduate certificates. For students that are accepted through a formal admissions process, the school also offers the degrees of Bachelor of Liberal Arts in Extension Studies (ALB) and Master of Liberal Arts in Extension Studies (ALM).

Harvard Professional & Executive Development was established in 2011 to provide working professionals with short, noncredit programs. The offerings were designed for those who wanted to build job skills in just a few days, with the educational content of a conference but the small-group environment of a traditional course. Harvard PDP features more than 120 programs across six topic areas, including leadership, business, innovation, marketing, negotiation, and communication. In the broader lifelong-learning mission of DCE, Harvard PDP serves tactical, skills-based teaching for those looking to complement their education or professional experience in a short timeframe.

Harvard Summer School, founded in 1871, is the first academic summer session established in the United States. Each summer, more than 5,000 students of all ages come to Harvard from across the United States and more than 100 foreign countries to study for seven weeks with faculty from Harvard and other universities. The Summer School offers approximately 300 daytime and evening classes in more than forty disciplines.

Harvard Institute for Learning in Retirement, created in 1977, offers retirees and other older adults an opportunity to explore new areas of knowledge in peer-taught study groups. Each year, approximately 500 people ranging in age from their fifties to their nineties participate in the Institute's programs.

== Organization and faculty ==
The Dean of Continuing Education and University Extension leads the Division. He or she is appointed by and reports to the Dean of the Faculty of Arts and Sciences. The Dean of the Harvard Summer School reports to the Dean of Continuing Education. The Summer School and the Extension School draw their instructors from Harvard University, other institutions of higher learning, and the private sector.
