= Nancy Coleman (educator) =

American educator

- Occupation: Educator
- Known for: Dean of the Division of Continuing Education and University Extension at Harvard University

Academic background
- Education: Stonehill College (BS); Boston University (MBA); George Washington University (EdD)

Nancy Coleman is an American educator. She has served as the Dean of the Harvard Division of Continuing Education, which includes Harvard Extension School, since July 2020.

== Education ==
Colemen earned a B.S. in marketing from Stonehill College and an Master of Business Administration from Questrom School of Business at Boston University. She also earned a Ed.D. in Human and Organizational Learning from George Washington University in 2016. She wrote her dissertation on leadership behaviors in distance education units.

== Career ==
Coleman was Vice President of Academic Services at Keypath Education, an online program management provider from 2014 to 2016. For ten years, she was the Vice President of New Business Development with Advanced Management Services.

After serving as assistant director for three years, Coleman was promoted to Director of Distance Education at Boston University in 2008 and stayed in that position until 2014. Here, she oversaw all online degrees and courses. During her tenure at Boston University, the department she led earned several national distance learning awards including Sloan-C Excellence in Institution Wide Online Learning and multiple United States Distance Learning Association (USDLA) teaching and curriculum awards.

She then went on to become the Associate Provost and founding Director of Strategic Growth Initiatives at Wellesley College in 2016. There, she created and led Wellesley Extended which provided summer programs, online learning, and professional education.

On July 13, 2020, Coleman became the 7th dean of the Harvard Division of Continuing Education. She is the first woman to lead this institution. She has previously worked in both small and large institutions, the corporate world, start-ups, and has taught both online and in the classroom. Coleman is a certified Project Management Professional.

== Professional organizations ==
Coleman is the founder of the Contemporary Women’s Leadership Institute, a global program for undergraduate women.

In 2020 and 2021, Coleman was president of the University Professional and Continuing Education Association.
