= Hopi Hoekstra =

Evolutionary biologist

Dean of the Harvard Faculty of Arts and Sciences
- Incumbent
- Assumed office August 1, 2023
- Preceded by: Claudine Gay; Emma Dench (acting)

Personal details
- Born: July 1972 (age 54)
- Education: University of California, Berkeley (B.A.); University of Washington (Ph.D)
- Awards: National Academy of Sciences (2016); Richard Lounsbery Award (2015); C. Hart Merriam Award (2019)

Danielle "Hopi" Elisabeth Hoekstra (born 1972) is an evolutionary biologist at Harvard University, where she is Dean of the Harvard Faculty of Arts and Sciences. Her lab uses natural populations of rodents to study the genetic basis of adaptation.

She is the C.Y. Chan Professor of Arts and Sciences and the Xiaomeng Tong and Yu Chen Professor of Life Sciences in the Department of Organismic and Evolutionary Biology and the Department of Molecular and Cellular Biology at Harvard University. She is also the Curator of Mammals at the Museum of Comparative Zoology and a Harvard College Professor.

In 2014, Hoekstra became a Howard Hughes Medical Institute investigator. In 2016, she was elected to the National Academy of Sciences, and in 2017, she was elected to the American Academy of Arts and Sciences. Hoekstra became the Edgerley Family Dean of Harvard's Faculty of Arts and Sciences in August 2023.

== Early life and education ==
Hoekstra was born in 1972 to a family of Dutch ancestry. Hoekstra's first name "Hopi" is derived from a Dutch term of endearment. Hoekstra attended Los Altos High School in California.

She attended college at the University of California, Berkeley, where she initially intended to study political science. She has stated that at one point she wanted to become the U.S. ambassador to the Netherlands, but she was drawn into biology by a class on biomechanics taught by Robert J. Full. She went on to work in Full's lab, studying the biomechanics of animal locomotion. One factor for choosing UC Berkeley was that she wanted to play Pac10 volleyball, which she did for two years.

== Career ==
Hoekstra received her B.A. in Integrative Biology from the University of California, Berkeley. Before her graduate studies, she researched grizzly bears for a year in Yellowstone National Park. She obtained her Ph.D. in Zoology as a Howard Hughes Predoctoral Fellow at the University of Washington. For her postdoctoral work, she studied the genetic basis of adaptive melanism in pocket mice at the University of Arizona with Professor Michael W. Nachman. In 2003, she became an assistant professor at the University of California, San Diego.

In 2007, she was hired by Harvard University, where she received tenure in 2010. She has served on the advisory board of several foundations, including Searle Scholars Program and Max Plank Society, magazines, including Scientific American and Quanta and journals, including PNAS, Current Biology, PLoS Genetics, Development, and bioRxiv.

In June 2023, she was named as the Dean of Harvard's Faculty of Arts and Sciences, succeeding Claudine Gay, who became president of Harvard University the month before. Hoekstra assumed office on August 1, 2023.

== Research ==
Hoekstra spent her scientific career working to understand the fundamental processes by which organisms, including humans, differ in the natural world. She capitalizes on natural variation in non-traditional model organisms, most notably the deer mouse, a system she pioneered. Her work is characterized by its an interdisciplinary approach, utilizing both field and lab experiments. Her laboratory’s overarching research strategy is to use tools from genetics, development and neuroscience to discover novel mechanisms by which evolution shapes biodiversity and, conversely, to use biodiversity as a tool to reveal general principles in biology.

Based on this work, she has been featured in National Geographic and profiled in the New York Times.

=== Behavioral Genetics ===
Hoekstra is best known for studying the genetic mechanisms that influence the evolution of highly complex natural behaviors. In 2013, Hoekstra published an article in the journal Nature on the genetics of burrowing behavior in two sister species of Peromyscus mice; the oldfield mouse (P. polionotus), which builds elaborate burrows complete with an escape tunnel, and the deer mouse (P. maniculatis), which builds a simple and shallow nest. Using a combination of behavioral assays and classical genetic strategies, Hoekstra and her students identified four regions of DNA which control the length of the tunnels dug by the mice. Trainees in her lab have also identified a specific gene that affects parental behavior and also are genetically dissecting variation in other behaviors such as vocalization and skilled motor behavior.

=== Color Adaptation ===
Hoekstra started her career studying the evolution of mouse fur color and its significance for adaptation. She was among the first to identify a specific DNA mutation and directly link it to fitness in the wild, a result found in many modern textbooks. In 2013, her team published an article in the journal Science, describing how coat color in mice was controlled by nine separate mutations within a single gene, named "agouti." Speaking about this discovery, Hoekstra said, "The question has always been whether evolution is dominated by these big leaps or smaller steps. When we first implicated the agouti gene, we could have stopped there and concluded that evolution takes these big steps as only one major gene was involved, but that would have been wrong. When we looked more closely, within this gene, we found that even within this single locus, there are, in fact, many small steps." Her work supports the hypothesis that evolution can occur through incremental changes. Recently, Hoekstra has found evidence linking the mutation the Agouti gene to survival in mice. More specifically, the study showed how a sequence variant in the Agouti gene changes the phenotype and then linked those changes to changes in population allele frequency, demonstrating evolution of trait by natural selection. More recently, her lab has discovered the developmental origins of complex color patterns.

== Honors and awards ==
- 2022 Awarded the Lowell Thomas Award
- 2021 Elected as a Fellow to the American Association for the Advancement of Science
- 2019 Awarded the Hart Merriam Award
- 2018 Elected to the American Philosophical Society
- 2017 Elected to the American Academy of Arts and Sciences
- 2016 Elected to the National Academy of Sciences
- 2015 Richard Lounsbery Award, National Academy of Sciences
- 2006 Beckman Young Investigator Award, Arnold and Mabel Beckman Foundation
- 2003 Jasper J. Loftus-Hills Young Investigator Prize, American Society of Naturalists
- 1998 Ernst Mayr Award, Society of Systematic Biologists

== Family ==
Hoekstra lives in Cambridge, Massachusetts, with her son and her husband, James Mallet. Mallet is also an evolutionary biologist at Harvard.

== Selected publications ==
- Hager, Emily R.; Harringmeyer, Olivia S.; Wooldridge, T. Brock; Theingi, Shunn; Gable, Jacob T.; McFadden, Sade; Neugeboren, Beverly; Turner, Kyle M.; Jensen, Jeffrey D.; Hoekstra, Hopi E. (2022-07-22). "A chromosomal inversion contributes to divergence in multiple traits between deer mouse ecotypes". Science. 377 (6604): 399–405. doi:10.1126/science.abg0718. ISSN 1095-9203. PMC 9571565. PMID 35862520.
- Barrett, Rowan D. H.; Laurent, Stefan; Mallarino, Ricardo; Pfeifer, Susanne P.; Xu, Charles C. Y.; Foll, Matthieu; Wakamatsu, Kazumasa; Duke-Cohan, Jonathan S.; Jensen, Jeffrey D.; Hoekstra, Hopi E. (2019-02-01). "Linking a mutation to survival in wild mice". Science. 363 (6426): 499–504. doi:10.1126/science.aav3824. ISSN 1095-9203. PMID 30705186.
- Bendesky, Andres; Kwon, Young-Mi; Lassance, Jean-Marc; Lewarch, Caitlin L.; Yao, Shenqin; Peterson, Brant K.; He, Meng Xiao; Dulac, Catherine; Hoekstra, Hopi E. (2017-04-27). "The genetic basis of parental care evolution in monogamous mice". Nature. 544 (7651): 434–439. doi:10.1038/nature22074. ISSN 1476-4687. PMC 5600873. PMID 28424518.
- Mallarino, Ricardo; Henegar, Corneliu; Mirasierra, Mercedes; Manceau, Marie; Schradin, Carsten; Vallejo, Mario; Beronja, Slobodan; Barsh, Gregory S.; Hoekstra, Hopi E. (2016-11-24). "Developmental mechanisms of stripe patterns in rodents". Nature. 539 (7630): 518–523. doi:10.1038/nature20109. ISSN 1476-4687. PMC 5292240. PMID 27806375.
- Linnen, C.R.; Poh, Y.-P.; Peterson, B.K.; Barrett, R.D.H.; Larson, J.G; Jensen, J.; Hoekstra, H.E. (2013). "Adaptive evolution of multiple traits through multiple mutations at a single gene". Science. 339 (6125): 1312–1316. Bibcode:2013Sci...339.1312L. doi:10.1126/science.1233213. PMC 3836219. PMID 23493712.
- Weber, J.N.; Peterson, B.K.; Hoekstra, H.E. (2013). "Discrete genetic modules are responsible for the evolution of complex burrowing behaviour in deer mice". Nature. 493 (7432): 4202–405. doi:10.1038/nature11816. PMID 23325221. S2CID 4361153.
- Manceau, Marie; Domingues, Vera S.; Mallarino, Ricardo; Hoekstra, Hopi E. (2011). "The developmental role of Agouti in color pattern evolution". Science. 331 (6020): 1062–1065. Bibcode:2011Sci...331.1062M. doi:10.1126/science.1200684. PMID 21350176.
- Fisher, H.S.; Hoekstra, H.E. (2010). "Competition drives cooperation among closely-related sperm of deer mice". Nature. 463 (7282): 801–803. Bibcode:2010Natur.463..801F. doi:10.1038/nature08736. PMC 2824558. PMID 20090679.
- Linnen, CR; Kingsley, EP; Jensen, JD; Hoekstra, HE (August 2009). "On the origin and spread of an adaptive allele in deer mice". Science. 325 (5944): 1095–8. Bibcode:2009Sci...325.1095L. doi:10.1126/science.1175826. PMC 2736094. PMID 19713521..
- Hoekstra, Hopi E.; Hirschmann, Rachel J.; Bundey, Richard A.; Insel, Paul A.; Crossland, Janet P. (2006). "A single amino acid mutation contributes to adaptive beach mouse color pattern". Science. 313 (5783): 101–104. Bibcode:2006Sci...313..101H. doi:10.1126/science.1126121. PMID 16825572. S2CID 33376626.
- Nachman, M.W.; Hoekstra, H.E.; D'Agostino, S. L. (2003). "The genetic basis of adaptive melanism in pocket mice" (PDF). Proceedings of the National Academy of Sciences. 100 (9): 5268–5273. Bibcode:2003PNAS..100.5268N. doi:10.1073/pnas.0431157100. PMC 154334. PMID 12704245.
