= Peter A. Freeman =

American computer scientist

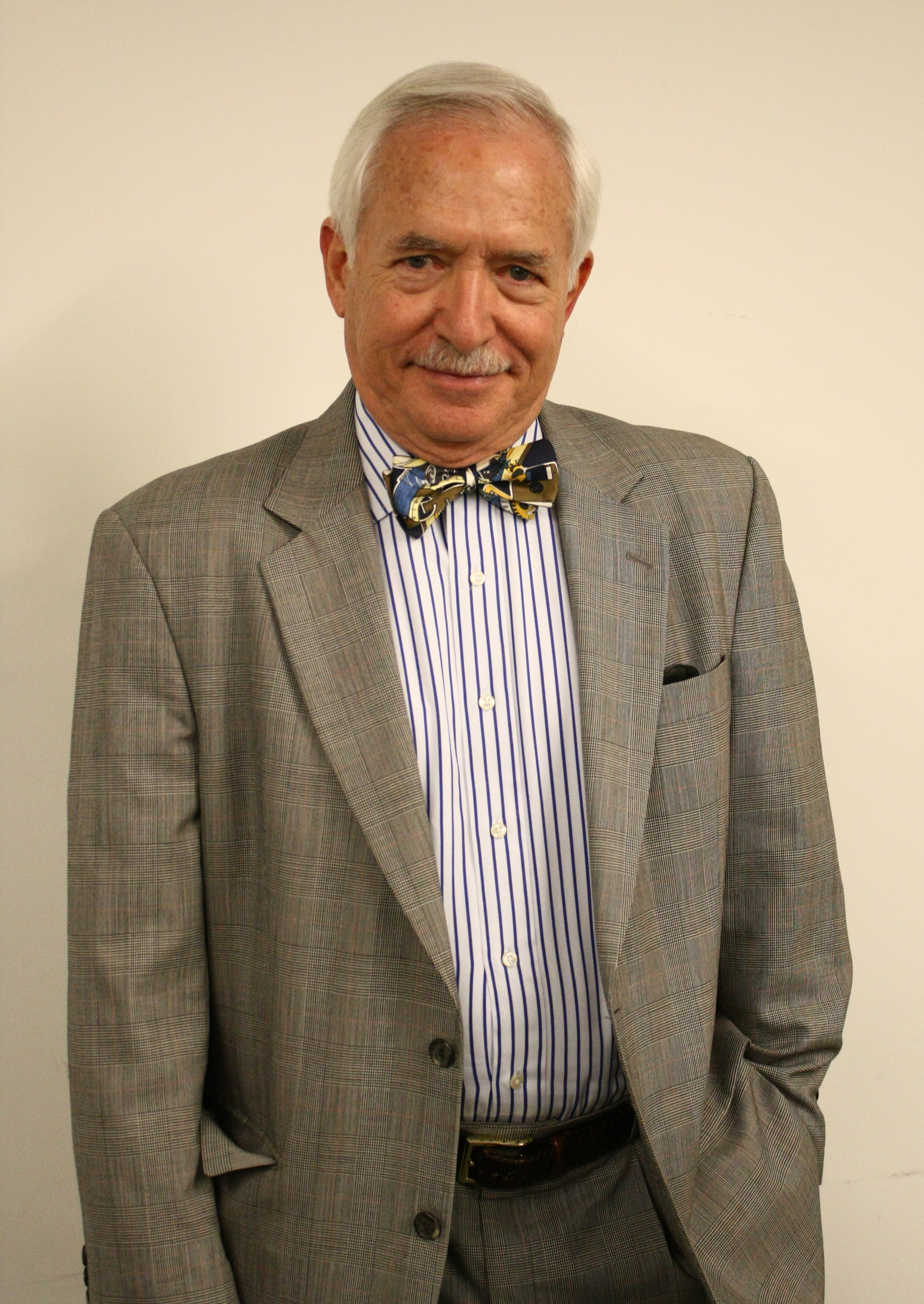
- Born: 1941 (age 84–85)
- Education: Carnegie Mellon University; University of Texas at Austin; Rice University
- Awards: IEEE Fellow, ACM Fellow, AAAS Fellow
- Scientific career
- Fields: Computer Science
- Workplaces: Washington Advisory Group; Georgia Institute of Technology; National Science Foundation; George Mason University; University of California, Irvine

Peter A. Freeman is the founding dean of Georgia Tech's College of Computing, a position he held from 1990 to 2002. Freeman was assistant director of the National Science Foundation from 2002 to 2007.

Freeman has been emeritus dean of the Georgia Tech College of Computing since 2007. He is currently the director of the Washington Advisory Group. Freeman is a Fellow of the Institute of Electrical and Electronics Engineers, the Association for Computing Machinery, and the American Association for the Advancement of Science.

== Education ==
Freeman received a Bachelor of Arts in physics and mathematics from Rice University in 1963, a Master of Arts in mathematics and psychology from the University of Texas at Austin in 1965, and a Ph.D. in computer science from Carnegie Mellon University in 1970.

== Early career ==
After graduation from Carnegie Mellon, Freeman was a researcher, professor, and administrator at the University of California, Irvine's Department of Information & Computer Science from 1971 to 1987, where he focused on artificial intelligence and software engineering research, funded primarily by the National Science Foundation. Freeman is one of the founders of software engineering education, starting a course on the subject in 1974. During the course of his career at UC Irvine, Freeman also administered the undergraduate and graduate programs and served as the department chair.

In 1987, Freeman became the director of the National Science Foundation's Division of Computer and Computation Research; in this post, he managed about $20 million in grants each year, and helped develop the High Performance Computing and Communications program.

For a year after his post at NSF, Freeman served as a Visiting Distinguished Professor at George Mason University (1989–1990) to assist in the creation of a computing program at that university.

== Recent career ==
From 1992 to 1995, Freeman became the chief information officer of the Georgia Institute of Technology, and oversaw their Office of Information Technology (OIT) as it prepared for the 1996 Summer Olympics. At the time, OIT had an annual budget of $10 million.

When Georgia Tech was reorganized in 1988 under the administration of John Patrick Crecine (see History of Georgia Tech), the School of Information and Computer Science was promoted to college status, on the same administrative level as Georgia Tech's mainstay, the College of Engineering. Thus the Georgia Tech College of Computing was created. Freeman was selected as the college's founding dean and oversaw the program's transition and subsequent rapid growth; he would hold this post until 2002. Under his administration, the school added three research centers (including the Georgia Tech Information Security Center), increased research funding from $2 million annually to $10 million annually, hired 55 faculty members, and secured millions in funding for the construction of the College of Computing Building.

From 2002 to 2007 Freeman was held the position of Georgia Tech professor while he served as one of seven assistant directors of the National Science Foundation. At NSF, he led the $1 billion Information Technology Research program, helped form the GENI Project, led the Cyber-enabled Discovery and Innovation Initiative, and led initiatives to revitalize computer science education and attract minorities to computing.

In 2007, Freeman was named Emeritus Dean of the Georgia Tech College of Computing; in this position he consults with current administrators, faculty, and students; gives lectures and writes op-eds promoting issues in computer science.

Since 2007, Freeman has been the director of the Washington Advisory Group, where he advises on policy issues related to secondary education and research in STEM fields to companies, universities, governments, and non-profit organizations.
