= Georgia Institute of Technology - Daniel Guggenheim School of Aerospace Engineering =

Coordinates: 33.7722°N 84.3960°W

Daniel Guggenheim School of Aerospace Engineering
- Type: Public
- Established: March 3, 1930
- Chair: Mitchell L.R. Walker
- Total staff: 40+
- Students: 1,800+
- Location: Atlanta, Georgia, United States
- Campus: Urban
- Website: ae.gatech.edu

The Daniel Guggenheim School of Aerospace Engineering at the Georgia Institute of Technology, is an academic institution specializing in aerospace engineering education, research, and innovation. Located in Atlanta, Georgia, the school offers degree programs in Aerospace engineering that are accredited by ABET. It is a department under the Georgia Institute of Technology College of Engineering.

As of 2024, the Chair of the Daniel Guggenheim School of Aerospace Engineering is Mitchell L.R. Walker, Ph.D.

== Degrees offered ==
The Daniel Guggenheim School of Aerospace Engineering offers one undergraduate degree, and eight graduate degrees.

- Bachelor of Science (B.S) in Aerospace Engineering
- Master of Science in M.S Aerospace Engineering
- Master of Science (M.S.) in Bioengineering
- Master of Science (M.S.) in Computational Science and Engineering
- Doctor of Philosophy (Ph.D.) in Aerospace Engineering
- Doctor of Philosophy (Ph.D) in Bioengineering
- Doctor of Philosophy (Ph.D) in Computational Science and Engineering
- Doctor of Philosophy (Ph.D) in Machine Learning
- Doctor of Philosophy (Ph.D) in Robotics

== Enrollment and research ==
As of Fall 2023, The Daniel Guggenheim School of Aerospace Engineering reported that it had over 40 tenure-track professors and enrollment of more than 1,800 students.

The Daniel Guggenheim School of Aerospace Engineering earns over US$40,000,000 in research funding each year.

Research areas of The Daniel Guggenheim School of Aerospace Engineering include:

- Cyberphysical Systems, Safety, Security, & Reliability
- Large-Scale Computations, Data, & Analytics
- Mechanics of Multifunctional Structures and Materials
- Robotics, Autonomy and Human Interaction
- Space Exploration & Earth Monitoring
- Sustainable Transportation & Energy Systems
- System of Systems and Complex Systems Integration
- Vertical Lift and Urban air mobility

== Facilities ==
The Daniel Guggenheim School of Aerospace Engineering occupies four buildings, most of which are located in central/east campus:

- Montgomery Knight Building
  - Assistant Director for Operations, Human Resources, Academic Advising Office, AE Development, Academic Advising Manager, Loewy Library, AE Computer Lab, Cognitive Engineering Center, AE Machine Shop, Dynamics & Control Systems Lab, Low Turbulence Wind Tunnel, Structures Laboratory.
- Daniel Guggenheim Building
  - Computational Combustion Laboratory, Georgia Space Grant Consortium, Harper Wind Tunnel.
- Weber Space Science & Technology Building(s)
  - Aerospace Systems Design Lab (ASDL), Yang Aero Maker Space, Space Systems Design Lab (SSDL), Collaborative Visual Environment (CoVE) auditorium, Collaborative Design Environment (CoDE) auditorium.
- Engineering, Science, and Mathematics (ESM) Building
  - Air Transportation Laboratory, Center for Advanced Machine Mobility (CAMM), Center for Space Systems
