= UPCEA =

American university professional organization

UPCEA - (formerly University Professional and Continuing Education Association) is an American non-profit association for professional, continuing, and online higher education, mostly engaged in adult education. It was established in 1915 and has more than 400 member institutions, and 14,000 individuals.

== About ==
The association has served its members for over 100 years with conferences and specialty seminars, research and benchmarking information focusing on topics like alternative credentialing, adult (also known as non-traditional) students and the topics which are important for their success. This includes tracking and benchmarking the graduation and retention rates of non first-time full-time students, improving student outcomes, including increasing motivation for some-college, no credential demographic. Originally started as the National University Extension Association (NUEA), UPCEA was changed to the current name in 2010. Topics which the association focuses on also includes online education, and continuing education through professional networking opportunities and publications. Based in Washington, D.C., UPCEA also builds greater awareness of the vital link between contemporary learners and public policy issues, UPCEA is known for its research and consulting on matters like marketing as well as its work in alternative credentials and digital badging. It is also part of the prestigious Washington Higher Education Secretariat which includes other members, such as the American Council on Education, who serve a significant sector in post-secondary education.

== Networks ==
UPCEA has several different specialized areas of practice, called networks, which provide a place for those in similar backgrounds to provide research, presentations, and awards. They include:

- Business & Operations Network
- Community and Economic Engagement Network
- Credential Innovation Network
- eDesign Collaborative Network
- International Network
- Marketing, Enrollment, and Student Services Network
- Online Administration Network
- Program Planning and Implementation Network

== Major events ==
Events hosted by UPCEA include

- Annual Conference
- Summit for Online Leadership and Administration + Roundtable (SOLA+R)
- Distance Teaching & Learning (DT&L) Conference
- MEMS: Marketing, Enrollment Management, and Student Success Conference
- Convergence: Credential Innovation in Higher Education

Webinars and chats are also available: "University Professional & Continuing Education Association: Webinars and Chats".

== Notable people ==
- Robert Hansen, CEO, 2010-present

Recent Board Presidents

Name	Year Served	Institution
Thomas Gibbons	2012–2013	Northwestern University
Karen Sibley	2013–2014	Brown University
Bethaida González	2014–2015	Syracuse University
David Schejbal	2015–2016	University of Wisconsin, Extension
Alice Warren	2016-2017	North Carolina State University
Wayne Smutz	2017-2018	University of California Los Angeles
Sandi Pershing	2018-2019	University of Utah
Nelson Baker	2019-2020	Georgia Institute of Technology
Rovy Branon	2020-2021	University of Washington
Nancy Coleman	2021-2022	Harvard University
Lisa Templeton	2022-2023	Oregon State University
David Cillay	2023-2024	Washington State University
Kim Siegenthaler	2024-2025	City University of New York
Robert Bruce	2025-2026	Rice University
