= Georgia Tech Shenzhen Institute, Tianjin University =

College in Shenzhen, Guangdong, China

- 天津大学佐治亚理工深圳学院
- Type: Public
- Active: August 2014–September 2024
- Accreditation: March 2020
- Location: Shenzhen, Guangdong, China
- Campus: 40 acres (16 ha); Urban
- Language: English
- Website: www.gtsi.edu.cn/en

Georgia Tech Shenzhen Institute, Tianjin University (Chinese: 天津大学佐治亚理工深圳学院; GTSI) was an affiliated college of Tianjin University and an oversea campus of the Georgia Institute of Technology, located in Nanshan, Shenzhen, Guangdong, China. The campus was discontinued in September 2024 after U.S. congressional scrutiny over national security concerns.

== History ==
The institute was established as a joint venture between Tianjin University and the Georgia Institute of Technology in August 2014, and received higher education accreditation from the Ministry of Education of China in March 2020. The campus of the institute was approximately 40 acres large.

In 2020, the United States Department of Commerce added Tianjin University to the Entity List. In September 2024, Georgia Tech announced that it would exit the Shenzhen Institute, following U.S. congressional scrutiny of Georgia Tech's potential ties with the People's Liberation Army. Current students were able to complete their degree requirements and study abroad programs.

== Programs ==
The institute offered undergraduate and graduate programs in electrical and computer engineering, as well as related fields. It was accredited by the Southern Association of Colleges and Schools Commission on Colleges, and mostly catered to graduate students pursuing degrees in Masters of Science.
