= Logicworks =

Cloud computing company

- Company type: Private
- Industry: Cloud Consulting; Cloud Modernization, Migration, & Operations
- Founded: 1993
- Headquarters: New York City, NY, USA
- Area served: International; United States
- Key people: Kenneth Ziegler (CEO); John Cerciello (CRO); Stephanie Tayengco (CIO); Dino Ewing (CFO)
- Products: End-to-End AWS & Azure Cloud Solutions; Cloud Strategy & Consulting; Cloud Modernization & Refresh; Cloud Management & Operations
- Website: logicworks.com

Logicworks is a platform driven cloud modernization, migration, and operations provider headquartered in New York City. Logicworks provides platform driven cloud modernization, migration, and operations solutions for Amazon Web Services and Microsoft Azure cloud infrastructures.

== History ==
Logicworks provides end-to-end cloud solutions to AWS & Azure customers. Logicworks was founded in February 1993 as a traditional managed hosting provider specializing in complex workloads. Logicworks pivoted to provide AWS managed services in 2012, and expanded its offering on the AWS platform over time. In 2015, Logicworks achieved AWS Premier Partner status, and subsequently added Microsoft Azure Managed Services later in 2015. In December 2016, Logicworks announced that it raised $135 Million from private equity firm, Pamplona Capital, to grow its cloud reliability platform and expand its AWS & Azure offerings. In 2017, Logicworks announced support for Microsoft Azure. In June 2021, Logicworks reached $100M in revenue and launched its Cloud Reliability Platform to enhance and power its cloud operations solutions

In February 2023, it was announced Logicworks had been acquired by the Atlanta-headquartered telecommunications and broadband company, Cox Communications.

== See also ==
- 3M
- Allianz
- Everly Health
- Janus Henderson
- Myriad Genetics
- Prisma Health
- ServPro
