= Internet Security Systems =

American security software company

- Type: Public
- Industry: Software
- Founded: Atlanta, Georgia, United States (1994)
- Founder: Chris Klaus
- Fate: Acquired by IBM; division later consolidated
- Headquarters: 6303 Barfield Road, Atlanta, Georgia, United States
- Key people: Ginni Rometty (Chairman, President, and CEO)
- Services: Computer security
- Parent: IBM (2006–2011)
- Website: iss.net at the Wayback Machine (archived 1996-12-08)

Internet Security Systems, Inc., often known simply as ISS or ISSX (after its former NASDAQ ticker symbol), was a provider of security software and managed security services. It provided software and services for computers, servers, networks, and remote locations that involve preemptive security against threats before they affect a business. Founded in 1994, the company was acquired by IBM in 2006.

== History ==
In 1992, while attending the Georgia Institute of Technology, Christopher Klaus developed the first version of Internet Security Scanner. In 1994, Klaus founded Internet Security Systems (ISS) to further develop and market Internet Security Scanner, which later became Internet Scanner. Although the larger shareholder, Klaus took the role of chief technology officer (CTO), while Tom Noonan was recruited as chief executive officer in 1995. In 1996 David Strohm from Greylock Ventures and Bob Davoli, from Sigma Partners, led the first round of venture capital investment in ISS. In 1997, Ted Schlein from Kleiner Perkins and ATT Ventures invested in the next round. The initial public offering of the company on NASDAQ was on March 23, 1998.

Further products in security software space followed, including Network Sensor and Server Sensor which were both developed in-house. In 1998, ISS acquired the UK company March Information Systems, and rebranded their Security Manager product as System Scanner. About the same time, ISS acquired the company DbSecure, founded by Eric Gonzales and Aaron C. Newman, to add database security to their products. The DbSecure product was rebranded as Database Scanner. Subsequently, ISS acquired Network ICE and integrated their BlackICE technology into the ISS product range.

In 2004 Klaus stepped down as CTO, although he remained a significant shareholder and chief security advisor. His role as CTO was taken by Chris Rouland.

On August 23, 2006, IBM announced its intention to acquire Internet Security Systems for $1.36 billion and its Japanese subsidiary, ISS KK, for additional $570M. Total acquisition transaction size was $1.93 billion. On October 16, 2006, the deal was approved by ISS shareholders.

By 2011, IBM accumulated more than 10 security-related startups and these, including ISS, were integrated with the security intelligence software company Q1 Labs to form the Security Systems Division. The new unit was headed by Brendan Hannigan, who was Q1 Labs' previous CEO.

== Products ==
IBM has since discontinued ISS' signature product, the Proventia multifunction security appliance. This occurred after a long decline in tech support and licensing renewal service associated with the product.

Product families of ISS include:

- BlackICE
- Internet Scanner
- Network Sensor
- Proventia
- RealSecure
- Secure Log Manager
- Server Sensor
- Site Protector
- System Scanner
- Managed Security Services

Supported products include:

- Endpoint Secure Control
- Enterprise Scanner
- Internet Scanner
- IBM Open Signatures
- IBM Security Network Intrusion Prevention System (IPS)
- Proventia Desktop
- Proventia Management SiteProtector
- Proventia Management SiteProtector Web Console
- Proventia Network Mail Security
- Proventia Network Multi-Function Security
- Proventia Server Intrusion Prevention System for Linux
- Proventia Server Intrusion Prevention System for Windows
- Proventia Web Application Security
- Proventia Web Filter
- Virtual Server Protection for VMWare

== Location ==
IBM Internet Security Systems is headquartered in Sandy Springs, near Atlanta (Georgia, United States). Until late 2003 the company had significant development activities in Mountain View (California, United States), Kassel (Germany), Reading (UK) and Sydney (Australia), but all development has since been relocated to Atlanta. The company also maintains sales offices.

There were many support centers.
