= Kaneva =

American video game company

Kaneva, LLC
- Type: Corporation
- Industry: Video games
- Founded: 2004
- Founder: Christopher Klaus
- Successor: Kava, LLC
- Headquarters: Atlanta, Georgia
- Key people: Christopher Klaus (Founder/CEO); Greg Frame (Co-founder/CGO)
- Products: Kaneva
- Website: www.kaneva.com

Kaneva, LLC is a privately owned American video game company based in Atlanta, Georgia and founded in 2004 by Christopher Klaus and Greg Frame. Kaneva was a 3D virtual world that supported 2D web browsing, social networking and shared media.

On 1 July 2016, Kaneva's website suffered a data breach that exposed 3.9 million user records. The breach was reported on December 9, 2023. The data included email addresses, usernames, dates of birth and salted MD5 password hashes.

== History ==
The Virtual World of Kaneva was released into beta in mid-2006.

The "Elite Developers" program was discontinued with their source code release in November 2009.

Kaneva shifted from featured MMO development to smaller scale 3D application development which closely mirrors the very popular Facebook applications.

In 2017, the company launched a new game, CasinoLife Poker, for mobile platforms and as a Facebook app.
