= Jeff Trinkle =

American computer scientist

Jeffrey C. Trinkle is Professor and Chair of the Computer Science and Engineering department at Lehigh University in Bethlehem, Pennsylvania. He is known for his work in robotic manipulation, multibody dynamics, and automated manufacturing. He has bachelor's degrees in physics (1979) and engineering (1979) from Ursinus College and Georgia Institute of Technology, respectively, and a PhD (1987) from the University of Pennsylvania. He has taught at the University of Arizona, Rensselaer Polytechnic Institute, and Texas A&M University. From 1998 to 2003 he was a research scientist at Sandia National Laboratories in Albuquerque, New Mexico.

Trinkle's primary research interests lie in the areas of robotic manipulation, multibody dynamics, and automated manufacturing. With continuous support from the National Science Foundation since 1988, he has written over 100 technical articles. One of these articles (with David Stewart) was the first to develop a popular method for simulating multibody systems. Variants of this method are key components of several physics engines for computer game development, for example, NVIDIA PhysX and Bullet. For his work in the area of robotic grasping and dexterous manipulation, Trinkle was elected Fellow of the IEEE in 2010. He spent most of 2010 as a Humboldt Fellow at the Institute for Mechatronics and Robotics at the German Aerospace Center and the Institute for Applied Mechanics at Technical University of Munich.
