= Epoch Systems =

American computing storage company

Epoch Systems Inc.
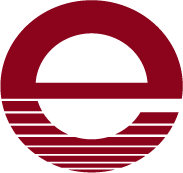
- Type: Private
- Founded: December 1, 1986
- Founder: Ken Holberger; Chuck Holland; Greg Kenley

Epoch Systems Inc., founded in December 1986, was a hardware and software company providing Hierarchical Storage Management (HSM) file servers, and distributed storage management and data backup software. The company was founded by Ken Holberger, Chuck Holland, and Gregory Kenley. Holberger and Holland had worked together as part of the Eagle project described in The Soul of a New Machine. Kenley was a software engineer with expertise in operating systems and storage management. The company began in Marlboro MA and eventually moved to Westborough MA.

== Products ==
The company's first product was the Epoch-1 Infinite Storage Server. The Epoch-1 consisted of custom 68020-based CPU board running a modified version of the BSD 4.2 Unix operating system. The product was released in 1988 and provided 30GB of storage in its base configuration, expandable to 150GB. The server combined optical and magnetic storage and used HSM algorithms to automatically migrate files between the two types of media as required. The base 30GB model sold for $158,000 with one 30GB optical disk library unit and one 760MB magnetic disk drive. By making use of high capacity and comparatively inexpensive (for that time) optical storage the Epoch-1 provided high storage capacity at substantially lower cost than all-magnetic file servers.

Epoch's second product, EpochBackup, included automatic scheduling, online backup and volume management features for Unix-based client workstations from a number of manufacturers, including DEC, IBM, Hewlett Packard, Silicon Graphics and Sun Microsystems.

In late 1990 Epoch released versions of its Renaissance storage management products for Sun, HP, and MIPS Technologies Unix workstations. The system provided HSM services for workstations and servers, automatically migrating least used files to an Epoch-1 server centrally located on the network to free up space when file systems became full. Files were automatically retrieved when accessed. Because of difficulties in implementing this product across many different Unix implementations, Epoch started the Data Management Interfaces Group with the goal of creating a common API for storage management.

== Funding ==
Epoch Systems raised $15.7M of venture capital in three different rounds from several firms including Charles River Ventures, Matrix Partners, Sigma Partners, TA Associates, Atlas Venture, Sierra Ventures, and Ampersand Ventures. The company was bought by EMC for approximately $140M on August 31, 1993.

== Sources ==
- Kidder, Tracy (1981). The Soul of a New Machine. Little, Brown and Company. Reprint edition July 1997 by Modern Library. ISBN 0-679-60261-5.
- US 5276867, Kenley, Gregory & et al., "Digital data storage system with improved data migration", issued Jan 4 1994
- US 5367698, Webber, Neil & Israel, Robert, "Network File Migration System", issued Nov 22 1994
