= Harvard Faculty of Arts and Sciences =

Largest of the twelve faculties that constitute Harvard University

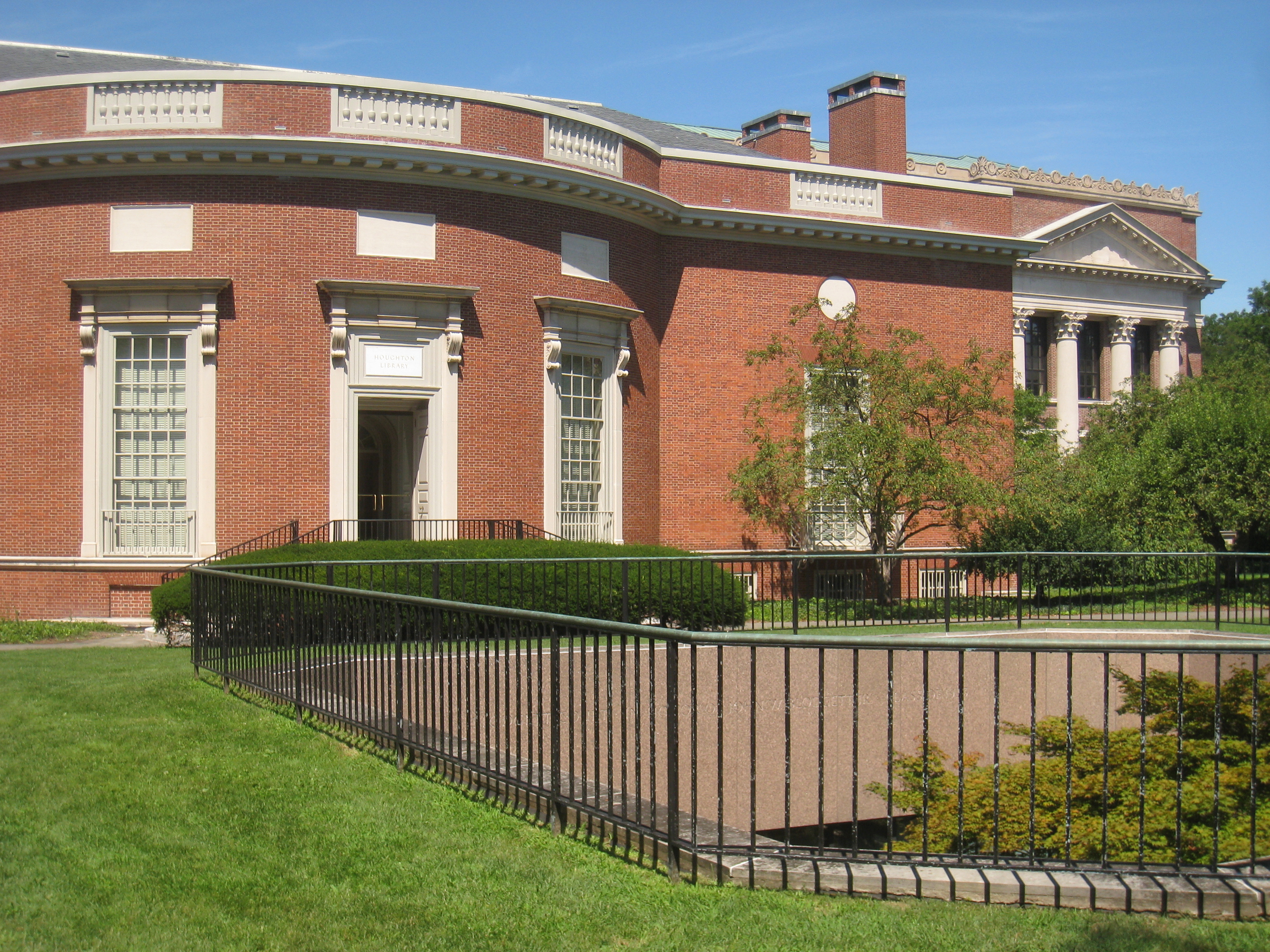
- Houghton Library, which serves Harvard's Faculty of Arts and Sciences
- Established: 1890; 136 years ago
- Parent institution: Harvard University
- Endowment: $17.5 billion (2019)
- Budget: $1.6 billion (2019)
- Dean: Hopi Hoekstra
- Academic staff: 1,221 (2019)
- Undergraduates: 6,800
- Postgraduates: 4,500
- Location: Cambridge, Massachusetts, U.S. 42°22′27.15″N 71°06′59.62″W
- Schools: Harvard College; Graduate School of Arts and Sciences; Others, see § Organization
- Website: Official website
- Location within Massachusetts

The Faculty of Arts and Sciences (FAS) is a faculty of Harvard University. It administers the undergraduate Harvard College, the Graduate School of Arts and Sciences, the School of Engineering and Applied Sciences, and the Division of Continuing Education, among other divisions.

== History ==
=== 19th century ===
While Harvard College traces its origins to 1636, the body called the Faculty of Arts and Sciences came into existence in the late 19th century. From 1820 until 1872, Harvard University consisted of the college and three professional schools in law, medicine, and divinity. The governing boards established a Graduate Department in 1872 to administer and recommend candidates for the degrees of Master of Arts, Master of Science, Doctor of Philosophy, and Doctor of Science.

In 1890, the governing boards merged separate faculties of the Lawrence Scientific School and the College into a single Faculty of Arts and Sciences. The Graduate Department later became the Graduate School of Arts and Sciences.

The Lawrence Scientific School opened in 1847 and marked Harvard's first major effort to offer a formal program in science and engineering.

=== 20th century ===
In 1948, the School merged with the Department of Engineering Sciences and Applied Physics in FAS to form the Division of Engineering and Applied Sciences.

=== 21st century ===
In 2007, the Division of Engineering and Applied Sciences formally became the School of Engineering and Applied Sciences.

On June 3, 2015, the School of Engineering and Applied Sciences was renamed the Harvard John A. Paulson School of Engineering and Applied Sciences, following a $400 million gift by Harvard Business School alumnus John A. Paulson.

As of Fall 2019, FAS comprised 1221 total faculty, including 719 tenured and tenure-track professors as well as 502 other professors, lecturers, preceptors, and visiting faculty in some 30 academic departments in the arts and humanities, the social sciences, the natural sciences, and the engineering and applied sciences. There are approximately 6,800 undergraduates (Harvard College) and 4,500 graduate students (Kenneth C. Griffin Graduate School of Arts and Science). The Harvard Division of Continuing Education has 795 admitted undergraduate students and 3,100 admitted graduate students. Furthermore the Harvard Division of Continuing Education welcomes more than 30,000 students annually in its open enrollment courses. In 2019, FAS had a budget of $1.6 billion and a revenue of $1.6 billion.

As of 2019, the FAS endowment had a market value of $17.5 billion. Harvard's total endowment stands at $40.9 billion.

In 2023, following a $300 million unrestricted donation by hedge fund manager Kenneth Griffin, the Graduate School of Arts and Sciences was renamed Kenneth C. Griffin Graduate School of Arts and Science (GSAS).

The faculty was headed by interim dean Emma Dench until August 1, 2023, when Hopi Hoekstra became Dean of FAS.

On July 10, 2025, Faculty of Arts and Sciences internally announced that it would shutter Harvard College's diversity office and replace it with an Office for Academic Culture and Community.

== Organization ==
FAS consists of the following divisions:

1. Harvard College (established 1636)
2. Kenneth C. Griffin Graduate School of Arts and Science (established 1872)
3. The John A. Paulson School of Engineering and Applied Sciences (established 1847)
4. The Division of Continuing Education (established 1871)
5. Arts & Humanities Division (established 2004)
6. Division of Science (established 2007)
7. Division of Social Science (established 2004)
8. Athletics (established 1780)
9. Harvard Library (established 1638)
10. Museums of Science and Culture (established 2012)

In addition, FAS includes 35 research centers, institutes, and interdisciplinary programs, eleven museums, and numerous libraries.

The dean of FAS serves as the chief administrative and academic officer, responsible to the president and provost of Harvard University for all aspects of the division's operations, including budgets, planning, support services, faculty appointments, curricula, student affairs, and fundraising. The dean is appointed by the president with the approval of the university's two governing boards, the Harvard Corporation and the Harvard Board of Overseers, and serves at the pleasure of the president. The dean of FAS is invariably drawn from the ranks of the tenured faculty in the division.

The deans of Harvard College, GSAS, SEAS, and DCE report to the dean of FAS, as do various academic deans, administrative deans (including those responsible for finance, development, faculty personnel policy, undergraduate admissions and financial aid), and the directors of various research centers and institutes.

From 2018 to 2023, the FAS was headed by Claudine Gay. Following Gay's ascension to president of the university, Hopi Hoekstra was announced to become the new dean of FAS beginning August 1st, 2023.

== Harvard College Professorship ==
For commitments to undergraduate teaching, the Faculty of Arts and Sciences confers on certain faculty members the title of Harvard College Professor. Considered Harvard's highest honor in recognition of distinguished teaching, the professorship is a five-year title which also comes with additional research funding.

Harvard University also awards the title of University Professor, but the two are not synonymous.
