= Georgia Institute of Technology College of Engineering =

Engineering college in Atlanta, Georgia, US

Coordinates: 33.772356°N 84.394838°W

- Type: Public
- Established: 1885
- Dean: Raheem Beyah
- Undergraduates: 8,538 (fall 2024)
- Postgraduates: 11,838 (fall 2024)
- Location: Atlanta, Georgia, U.S.
- Website: www.coe.gatech.edu

The College of Engineering at the Georgia Institute of Technology provides formal education and research in more than 10 fields of engineering, including aerospace, chemical, civil engineering, electrical engineering, industrial, mechanical, materials engineering, biomedical, and biomolecular engineering, plus polymer, textile, and fiber engineering. The College of Engineering is the oldest and largest college of the institution.

== History ==
The history of the College of Engineering spans more than 125 years, since the founding of Georgia Tech. Beginning with classes for mechanical engineering in 1888, the College of Engineering has evolved into separate Schools for more than 10 fields of engineering.

== Schools ==
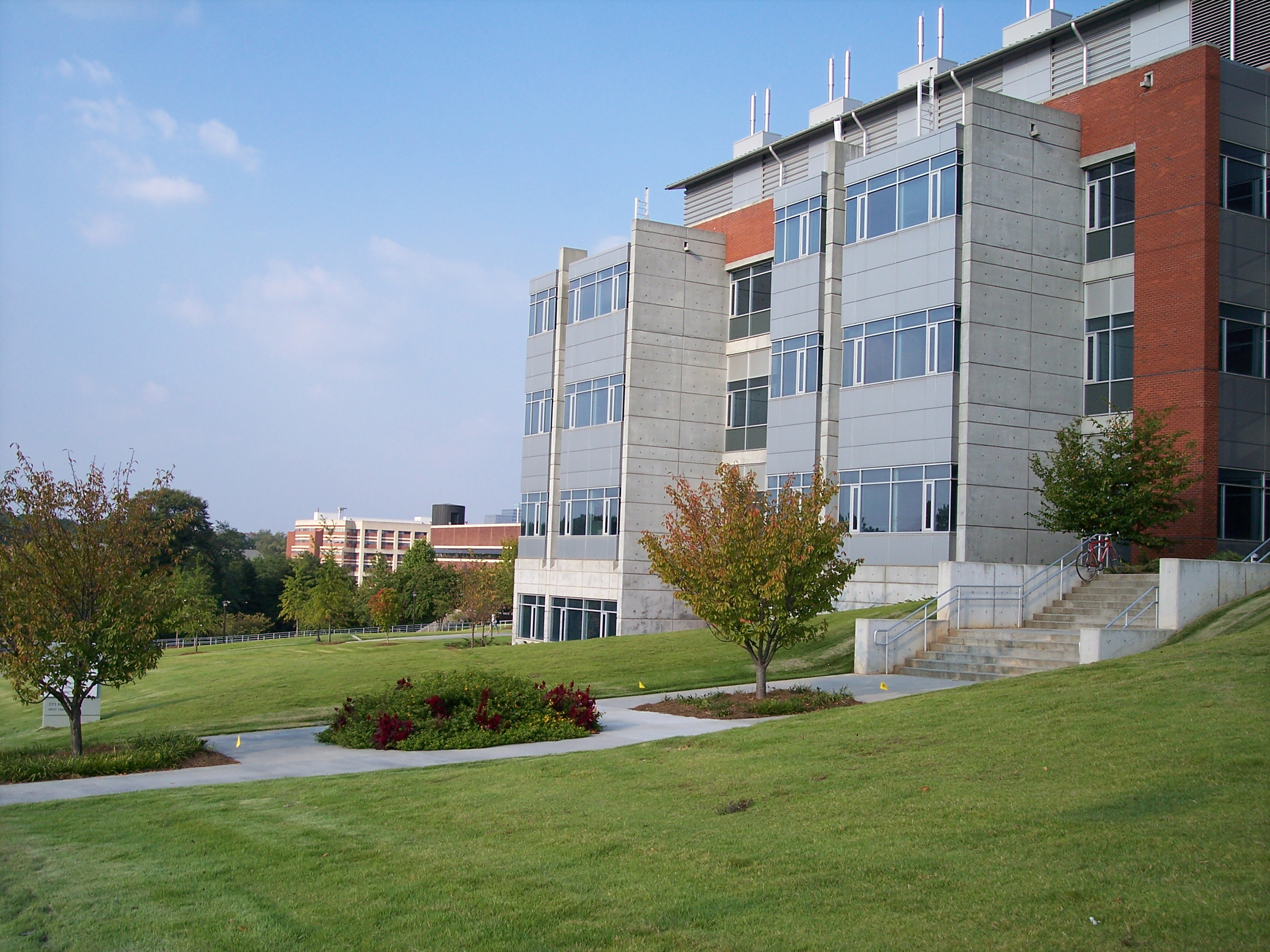
Georgia Tech's School of Mechanical Engineering

- Daniel Guggenheim School of Aerospace Engineering
- Wallace H. Coulter Department of Biomedical Engineering
- School of Chemical and Biomolecular Engineering
- School of Civil and Environmental Engineering
- School of Electrical and Computer Engineering
- H. Milton Stewart School of Industrial and Systems Engineering
- School of Materials Science and Engineering
- George W. Woodruff School of Mechanical Engineering

== Facilities ==
The offices of the College of Engineering are located on the third floor of Tech Tower.
