= Meron Gribetz =

Israeli American deep technology entrepreneur

- מירון גריבץ
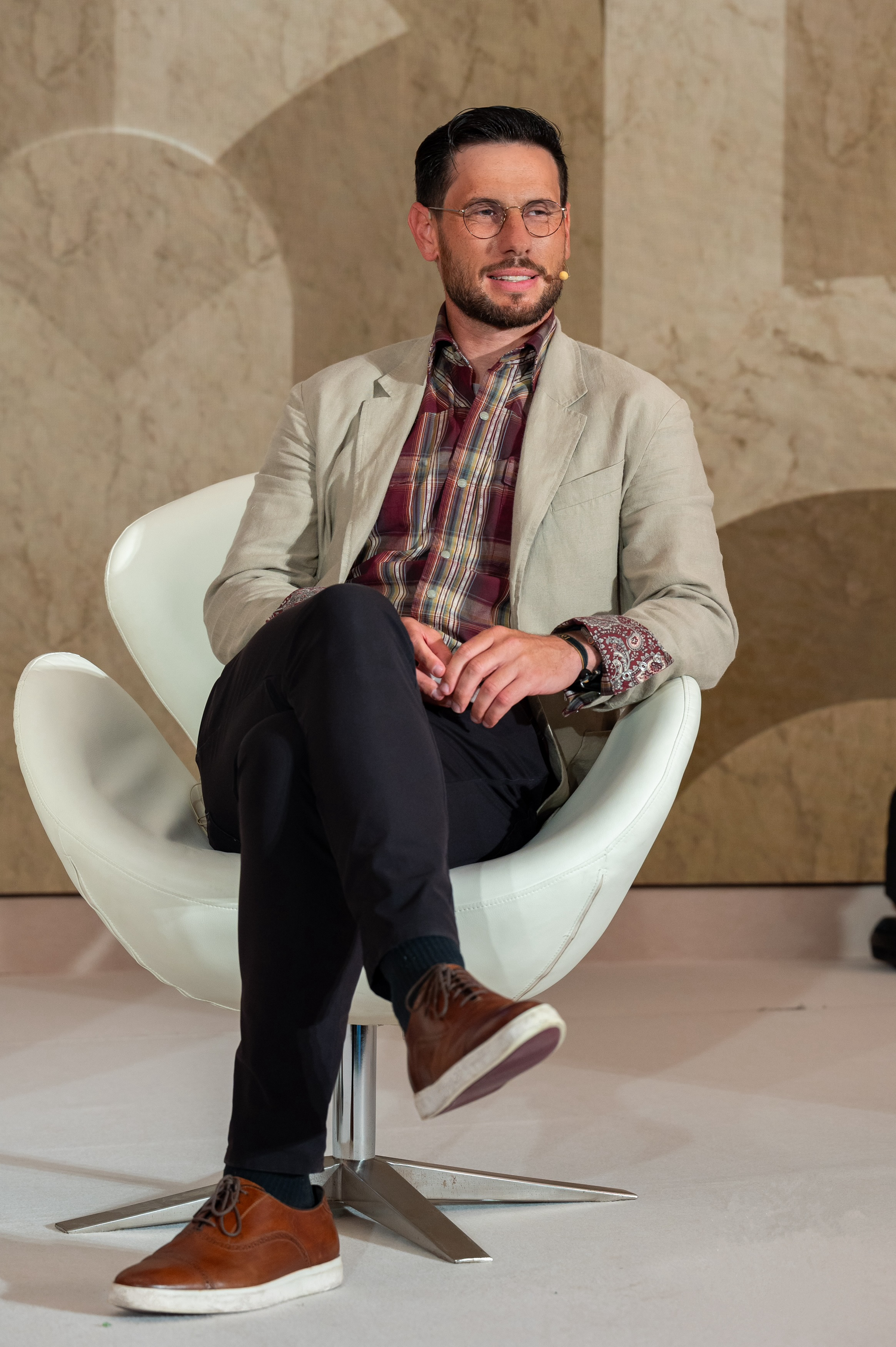
- Born: Israel
- Education: Columbia University
- Occupations: CEO, Inner Cosmos

Meron Gribetz (Hebrew: מירון גריבץ) is an Israeli American deep technology entrepreneur. He is the founder and CEO of Inner Cosmos, a company that created a digital pill designed to re-balance brain networks. Previously, he was the founder and CEO of Meta, a Silicon Valley technology company that produced augmented reality products, closed in 2019.

== Early life and education ==
Gribetz was born and raised in Jerusalem, Israel, where he worked for a number of national start-ups, as well as served in a technological unit in the Israel Defense Forces.

Beginning in 2009, he attended Columbia University in New York, where he studied computer science and neuroscience. He left Columbia shortly before the end of his studies to embark on his tech career. At Columbia, Meron conceived of the idea of a “natural machine” that would replace keyboards, mice, and touchscreens with a more intuitive interface.

== Inner Cosmos ==
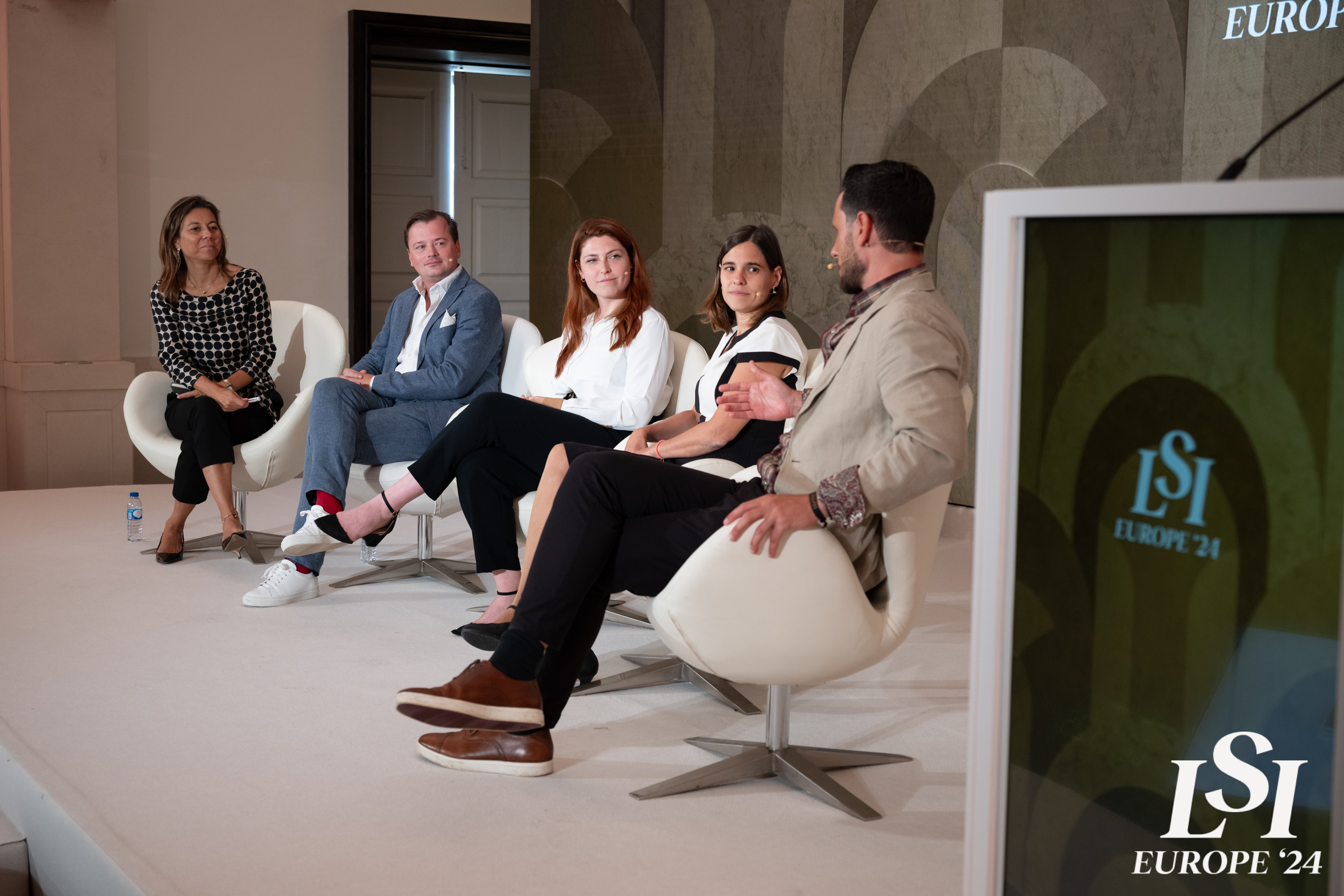
Inner Cosmos device presentation at the LSI Europe '24 Emerging Medtech Summit.

Gribetz is the founder and CEO of Inner Cosmos, a neurotechnology company based in San Francisco. The company develops minimally invasive brain-computer interfaces (BCIs), specifically a "Digital Pill" implant designed to treat treatment-resistant depression through at-home neurostimulation.

The company has recorded several clinical and regulatory milestones during his tenure:

Regulatory Approvals: In 2021, Inner Cosmos received an FDA Investigational Device Exemption (IDE) for a depression-focused neurostimulation implant, the first such approval in nearly 20 years.

Clinical Trials: The first human implantation occurred in 2022 at the Washington University School of Medicine. In 2025, the company completed its Early Feasibility Study, accumulating over 47 months of cumulative patient data.

Clinical Results: Data from trials conducted between 2023 and 2025 showed reductions in depressive symptoms among participants, with cases of clinical remission reported.

Technology: The "Digital Pill" is designed to replicate the effects of transcranial magnetic stimulation (TMS) in a smaller form factor, allowing patients to receive treatment at home while psychiatrists monitor and adjust parameters remotely.

== Meta ==
In 2012, while at Columbia University, Meron built a prototype AR headset by hacking a pair of 3D glasses from Epson and fusing them with an Intel-made camera that could track hand movements. In 2013, he founded Meta. The company was accepted into Y-Combinator (YC13). In 2014, Meta produced a see-through pair of glasses that allowed wearers to move and manipulate 3D content and holograms using hand gestures. The project received one million dollars in seed funding and support from Paul Graham and Steve Mann.

In 2016, Meron Gribetz introduced the Meta 2 at TED conference, an augmented reality headset intended to make it possible for users to see, grab, interact with, and move holograms in a natural fashion. Gribetz suggested this new technology was designed to allow users to interact with virtual objects yet maintain their sense of presence and interaction with their natural surroundings rather than being focused on or distracted by traditional 2D computer screens.

In 2018, Meta furloughed most of its one-hundred employees on short notice after it failed to secure another round of venture-capital funding. In 2019, the company declared itself insolvent and sold all its assets in a foreclosure sale.

== Awards ==
- "30 Under 30 Awards" in the Technology category by Forbes.
- The best heads-up display award for the Meta Pro at the Consumer Electronics Show.
- Wired’s list of “25 Geniuses Who Are Creating the Future of Business.”
- "Innovators Under 35" (Honoree of MIT Technology Review, 2016)

== See also ==
- Rony Abovitz, founder of Magic Leap
- Optical head-mounted display
