= Emsland Gymnasium =

Coordinates: 52°15′53″N 7°25′53″E

Location
- Bühnertstraße 120; Rheine; North Rhine-Westphalia; Germany

Information
- Type: Gymnasium
- Founded: 1853; 173 years ago
- Head teacher: Katharina Straßburg-Mulder
- Website: emsland-gymnasium-rheine.de

Emsland Gymnasium is a Gymnasium (secondary) school in Rheine, North Rhine-Westphalia, Germany. It was founded in 1853.

== History ==
Founded as a girls' school, the school became co-educational in 1972.

== Notable alumni ==
- Monika Hermanns, judge
- Gerda Hövel, Member of the Parliament of Lower Saxony
- Gudrun J. Klinker, computer scientist
- Lisa Paus, Member of the Bundestag
- Rita Süssmuth, politician and former President of the Bundestag
