= Gudrun J. Klinker =

German computer scientist and professor

- Born: Gudrun Johanna Rekers; 15 February 1958 (age 68); Fürstenau, Lower Saxony, Germany
- Education: Diplom 1982; Ph.D. 1988
- Alma mater: University of Hamburg; Carnegie Mellon University
- Known for: Augmented reality
- Spouse: Georg Klinker
- Children: two
- Awards: Robert-Sauer-Award of BAdW (2010); ISMAR 10 Years Lasting Impact Award (2014)
- Scientific career
- Fields: Computer Science
- Workplaces: University of Hamburg; Carnegie Mellon University; DEC (Cambridge Research Lab); European Computer-Industry Research Center (ECRC) Munich; Fraunhofer Munich/Darmstadt; Technical University of Munich
- Thesis: A Physical Approach to Color Image Understanding (1988)
- Doctoral advisor: Takeo Kanade
- Website: http://campar.in.tum.de/Chair/ResearchAr

Gudrun Johanna Klinker (born 15 February 1958) is a German computer scientist known for her work on augmented reality.

== Professional career ==
Klinker finished her graduate studies in informatics 1982 at Hamburg University. From 1983 to 1988 she worked as a teaching and research assistant at the computer science department of Carnegie Mellon University, where she earned her Ph.D. in 1988. From 1989 to 1998 she worked as a member of research staff up to scientific leader in research projects e.g. at Cambridge Research Lab of DEC, European Computer-Industry Research Center (ECRC) in Munich and Fraunhofer project group for augmented reality in Munich/Darmstadt. After two years working as a freelance expert for augmented reality she joined the faculty of Technical University of Munich as a full professor for augmented reality in May 2000.

Her research focus lies on bringing augmented reality technology into real applications by combining augmented reality with concepts of mobile and ubiquitous computing. This includes the fields of sensing, ubiquitous tracking (sensor fusion), three-dimensional information presentation, three-dimensional interaction, human–computer interaction in cars, multi-touch displays, systems architectures for ubiquitous augmented reality and industrial augmented reality.

Klinker is counted among the co-founders of the International Symposium on Mixed and Augmented Reality (ISMAR). She has served on numerous program committees such as VR, Virtual Reality Software and Technology (VRST), three-dimensional User Interfaces (3DUI), and User Interface Software and Technology (UIST). She is author and co-author of more than 100 reviewed scientific publications.
