= Ronald Azuma =

American computer scientist

- Citizenship: United States
- Education: University of North Carolina
- Scientific career
- Fields: Augmented reality
- Workplaces: Intel Laboratories
- Thesis: Predictive tracking for augmented reality (1995)
- Doctoral advisor: T. Gary Bishop
- Website: ronaldazuma.com

Ronald Azuma is an American computer scientist, widely recognized for contributing to the field of augmented reality (AR). His work A survey of augmented reality became the most cited article in the AR field and is one of the most influential MIT Press papers of all time. Azuma is considered to provide a commonly accepted definition of AR and is often named one of AR’s most recognized experts.

== Awards and recognition ==
Azuma was named Fellow of the Institute of Electrical and Electronics Engineers (IEEE) in 2016 for contributions to Augmented Reality (AR).

== Patents ==
The list of most cited patents according to Google Scholar:

- Optical see-through augmented reality modified-scale display.
- Method and apparatus for image enhancement.
- Method and apparatus for generating augmented reality content.

== Publications ==
With his scientific research and publications, Azuma contributed on the international scale to the computer science field of augmented reality, including such publishers as MIT Press or IEEE. Below are his most cited articles, according to Google Scholar:

- A survey of augmented reality, MIT Press, 1997.
- Recent advances in augmented reality, IEEE, 2001.
- Improving static and dynamic registration in an optical see-through HMD, ACM, 1994.
