= Rony Abovitz =

American entrepreneur

- Born: 1971 (age 54–55); Israel
- Education: University of Miami (BS, MS)
- Occupations: Engineer, businessman, MAKO Surgical Corp. founder

Rony Abovitz (born 1971) is an American entrepreneur. Abovitz founded MAKO Surgical Corp., a company manufacturing surgical robotic arm assistance platforms, in 2004. MAKO was acquired by Stryker Corporation in 2013 for $1.65B.

Abovitz is the founder of Magic Leap, a company that specializes in augmented reality devices, and was its CEO from its founding in 2010. In May 2020, amid financial strife for the company, Abovitz stepped down from his position.

== Early life and education ==
Abovitz was born to an Orthodox Jewish family, the eldest of five children of Isaac and Itta Abovitz.

In 1962, his parents immigrated from Israel to Cleveland, Ohio in 1962. Abovitz's father worked in the real estate industry and his mother was an artist. He grew up playing Atari video games, and at the age of 8 he received his first computer which he says was an Apple Macintosh [Introduced in 1984, when he was 13]. In 1983, his family moved to Hollywood, Florida where he attended Nova High School in Davie, Florida. After high school, Abovitz aimed to have a career as a scientist.

Abovitz attended the University of Miami, where he eventually obtained a master's degree in biomedical engineering. While attending the University of Miami, he also was a cartoonist.

== Career ==
In 2011, Abovitz founded a augmented reality company called Magic Leap, based in Florida. The company maintains offices in New Zealand, in Los Angeles, Seattle, and Mountain View, California.

In 2017, Abovitz spoke at the Black Tech Week annual conference, where he shared some of his goals for the Magic Leap company.

In February 2018, Abovitz spoke at Recode’s Code Media conference about the augmented reality technology his company was developing.
