= Circular review system =

Armored vehicle situational awareness aid

A Circular review system is a system on board some armoured combat vehicles or tanks which provides the crew greater situational awareness (such as a 360° view) outside of the vehicle.

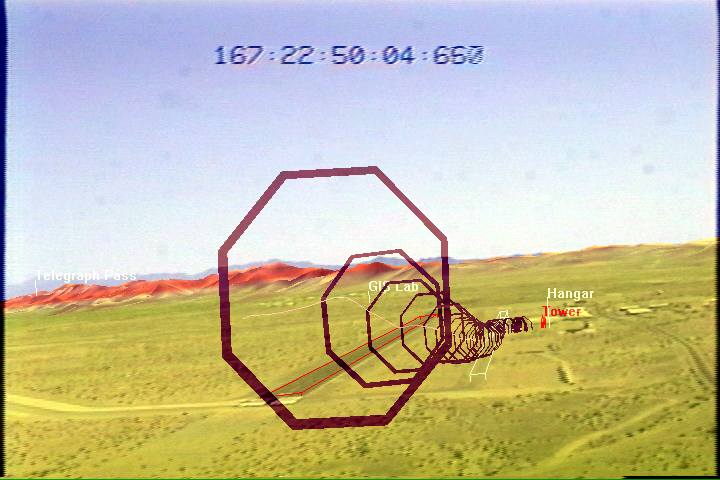
Illustration of using overlay marking runways, road, and buildings in Circular review system display

Differing systems may provide panoramic or enhanced imagery, Blue Force Tracking, marking of enemy positions, target acquisition, coordination of fire between networked combat vehicles, or enhanced threat recognition.

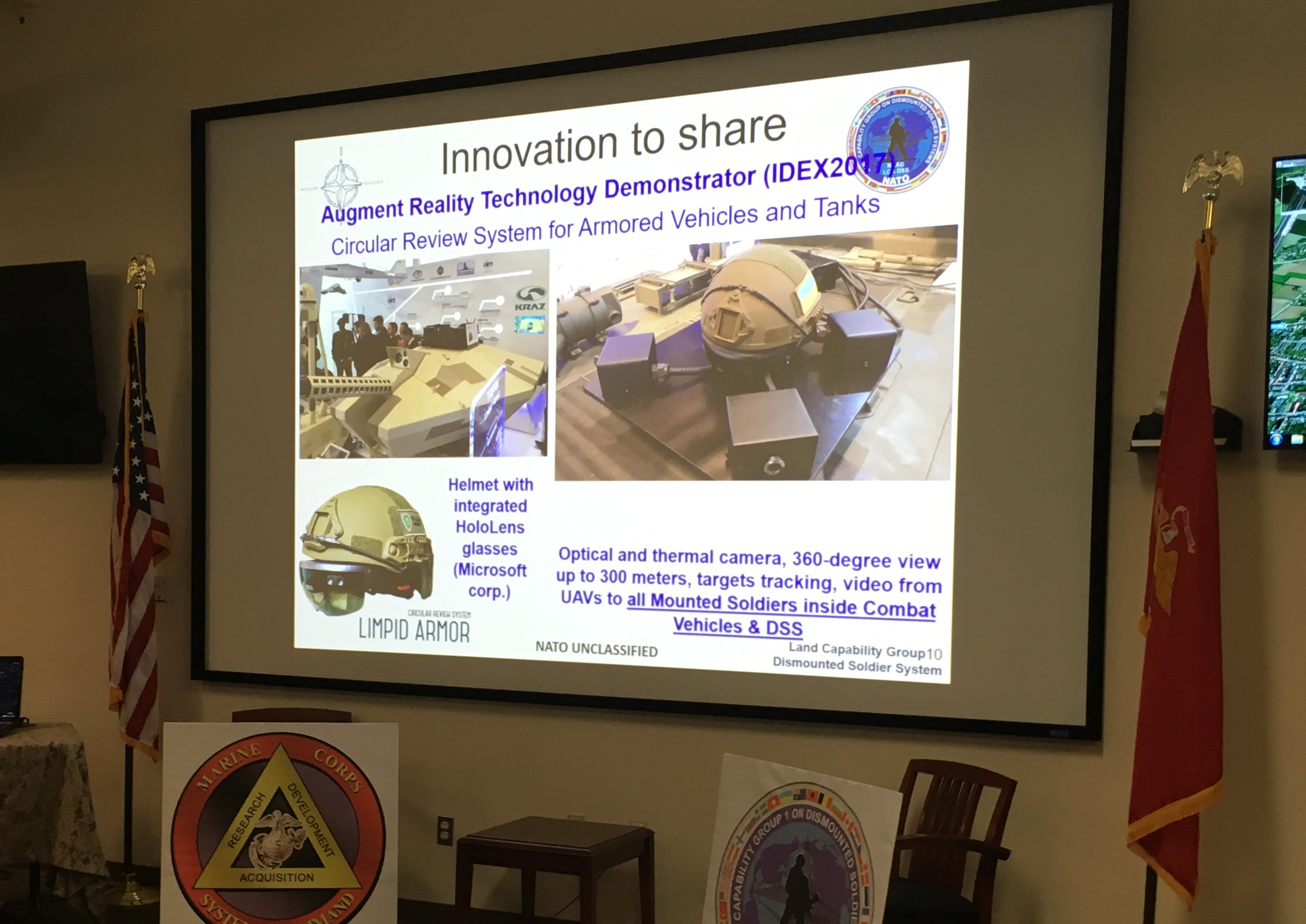
Circular review system of the company LimpidArmor

Imagery may be provided by sensors on the vehicle, or from external UAVs or UGVs. Information may be presented on helmet-mounted or other display systems.

== See also ==
- Augmented reality
- Artificial Intelligence
