= MAKO Surgical Corp. =

Medical device company

- Industry: Medical devices
- Founded: 2004
- Founder: Rony Abovitz, Maurice Ferre M.D.
- Defunct: December 17, 2013
- Fate: Acquired by Stryker Corporation
- Key people: Maurice Ferre M.D., Fritz LaPorte, former CFO, Treasurer, Sr. VP of Finance
- Products: RIO Robotic Arm Interactive Orthopedic Systems; RESTORIS Implants for partial knee and total hip arthroplasty
- Revenue: ▲US$ 102.72Million (2012)
- Net income: ▲US$ -32.55Million (2012)
- Website: makosurgical.com at the Wayback Machine (archived 2012-02-12)

MAKO Surgical Corp. was a publicly traded medical device company based in Florida. On September 25, 2013, the Board of Directors of Mako Surgical accepted a deal to be acquired by Stryker for $1.65B. The deal closed in December 2013.

Founded in 2004, the company manufactures and markets surgical robotic arm assistance platforms, most notably the RIO (Robotic Arm Interactive Orthopedic System) as well as orthopedic implants used by orthopedic surgeons for use in partial knee and total hip arthroplasty. They are known for their intellectual property of devices, and have over 300 U.S. and foreign patents and patent applications. The company has won numerous awards, including being named the fastest growing technology company in 2011 on Deloitte's Technology Fast 500. Before it was purchased, it was publicly traded on the NASDAQ under the stock symbol "MAKO."

== History ==
MAKO Surgical was founded in 2004 by Rony Abovitz and other key members of its predecessor Z-KAT, Inc. Z-KAT was founded in 1997 by Rony Abovitz, William Tapia, Michael Peshkin Ph.D., Julio Santos-Munne, and Wayne J. Kerness, M.D. and was developing a novel haptic robotic system for medical applications, amongst a wide variety of computer-assisted surgery technologies. Z-KAT's initial haptic robotic arm technology, known as the Whole Arm Manipulator (or WAM Arm) was originally developed at MIT and then at Barrett Technology. Z-KAT's core technology team had adapted the WAM Arm for use as a testbed for surgical procedures. The initial success of the internal tests led to the development of a business plan to focus exclusively on the idea of haptic robotic technology in orthopedic surgery. MAKO's original technical team (Rony Abovitz, Arthur Quaid Ph.D., Hyosig Kang Ph.D., Lou Arata, Ph.D., and others) demonstrated a number of breakthroughs in robotics and controls, enabling a haptic robotic system (6dof) to perform accurate bone shaping through minimally invasive incisions (knee and hip).

MAKO's first MAKOplasty Partial Knee Replacement Procedure was performed in June 2006 by Martin Roche M.D. and the company went public on the NASDAQ with their IPO in February 2008. The company's first MAKOplasty Total Hip Arthroplasty (THA) procedure was performed in October 2010. The company reached milestones with the 500th MAKOplasty procedure performed in 2008, the 1000th by 2009, and more than 23,000 by 2012.

== Products ==
MAKO Surgical Corp. markets the RIO Robotic Arm Interactive Orthopedic System and RESTORIS Family of Implants for partial knee and total hip arthroplasty, known as MAKOplasty. MAKOplasty increases accuracy in aligning and placing implants. The RIO system assists surgeons by creating a 3-D model of the patients' anatomy, enabling surgeons to develop a pre-surgical plan that customizes implant size, positioning and alignment specifically for each patient. During the procedure, real-time visual, tactile, and auditory feedback enforces a safety-zone and facilitates ideal implant positioning and placement, which reduces potential for complications.

MAKOplasty is offered in over 150 hospitals, such as Jordan Hospital in Massachusetts, Mercy Medical Center in Baltimore, Quincy Medical Center in Massachusetts, Hospital for Special Surgery in New York, the St. Cloud Hospital in St. Cloud, Minnesota, and the Mayo Clinic Hospital in Jacksonville, Florida.

Mako Total Knee was launched in 2017, which combines Mako Robotic-Arm Assisted Technology with the Triathlon Total Knee System

== Impact of acquisition ==
Stryker's 2013 acquisition of MAKO Surgical for $1.65B was criticized at the time as too expensive, but by 2019 Stryker felt justified in its purchase. In 2019, Stryker had about 860 Mako robots installed globally. By the end of 2020, about 44% of all its total knee replacement procedures were done with the Mako robot.

Stryker's move into robotics that began with its MAKO Surgical acquisition has developed further with the 2021 acquisition of OrthoSensor, adding an intraoperative sensor technology to enhance Stryker's Mako robots. Stryker's strength in robotics is cited as one cause of its upward stock price in 2021. Equity research analyst Dave Keiser identifies Mako as the transformational acquisition in terms of Stryker getting on board with robotics before some of their competitors in the space.

== Awards ==
- 2010, R&D Robotic 3D Visualization Surgical Tool Award for their RIO Robotic Arm Interactive Orthopedic System by Research and Development Magazine.
- 2010, Gold Medical Design Excellence Award.
- 2010, Fast Tech Award for being one of the fastest growing technology companies in South Florida by the South Florida Business Journal.
- 2011, No.1 on the Technology Fast 500 as the fastest growing technology company by Deloitte.
- 2011, Fast Tech Award as one of the 25 fastest growing technology companies in South Florida by South Florida Business Journal.
- 2011, CSSEC Award for loyal, customer-focused staff members presented by the Technology Services Industry Association.
- 2011, ACE Award (Achievement in Customer Excellence) from MarketTools.
- 2012, South Florida Manufacturer of the Year by the South Florida Manufacturers Association.

== See also ==
- Arthroplasty
- Knee replacement
- Hip replacement
- Robotic surgery
