= Armstrong Laboratory =

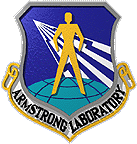
- Active: 1990–October 1997
- Country: United States
- Branch: Air Force
- Role: Research and development
- Part of: Air Force Systems Command (1990-1992); Air Force Materiel Command (1992-1997)
- Garrison/HQ: Brooks City-Base, Texas

Armstrong Laboratory was a research and development organization operated by the United States Air Force Materiel Command. In 1997, the Laboratory was merged into the Air Force Research Laboratory.

The Laboratory was named after Gen Harry G. Armstrong, known as "the father of space medicine."

== See also ==
- Virtual fixture, augmented reality system developed at Armstrong Laboratory
