= Magic Leap =

American augmented reality hardware manufacturer

Magic Leap, Inc.
- Company type: Private
- Headquarters: Plantation, Florida
- Founder: Rony Abovitz
- CEO: Ross Rosenberg
- Website: magicleap.com
- Launched: 2010
- Current status: Active

Magic Leap, Inc. is an American technology company that makes augmented reality headsets and software. Its first product was a head-mounted augmented reality display, called Magic Leap One, which superimposes 3D computer-generated imagery over real world objects. It is attempting to construct a light-field chip using silicon photonics. The company has since released the Magic Leap 2 and stopped selling the Magic Leap 1.

Magic Leap was founded by Rony Abovitz in 2010 and has raised $2.6 billion from a list of investors including Google and Alibaba Group.

Ross Rosenberg became CEO in 2023.

== History ==
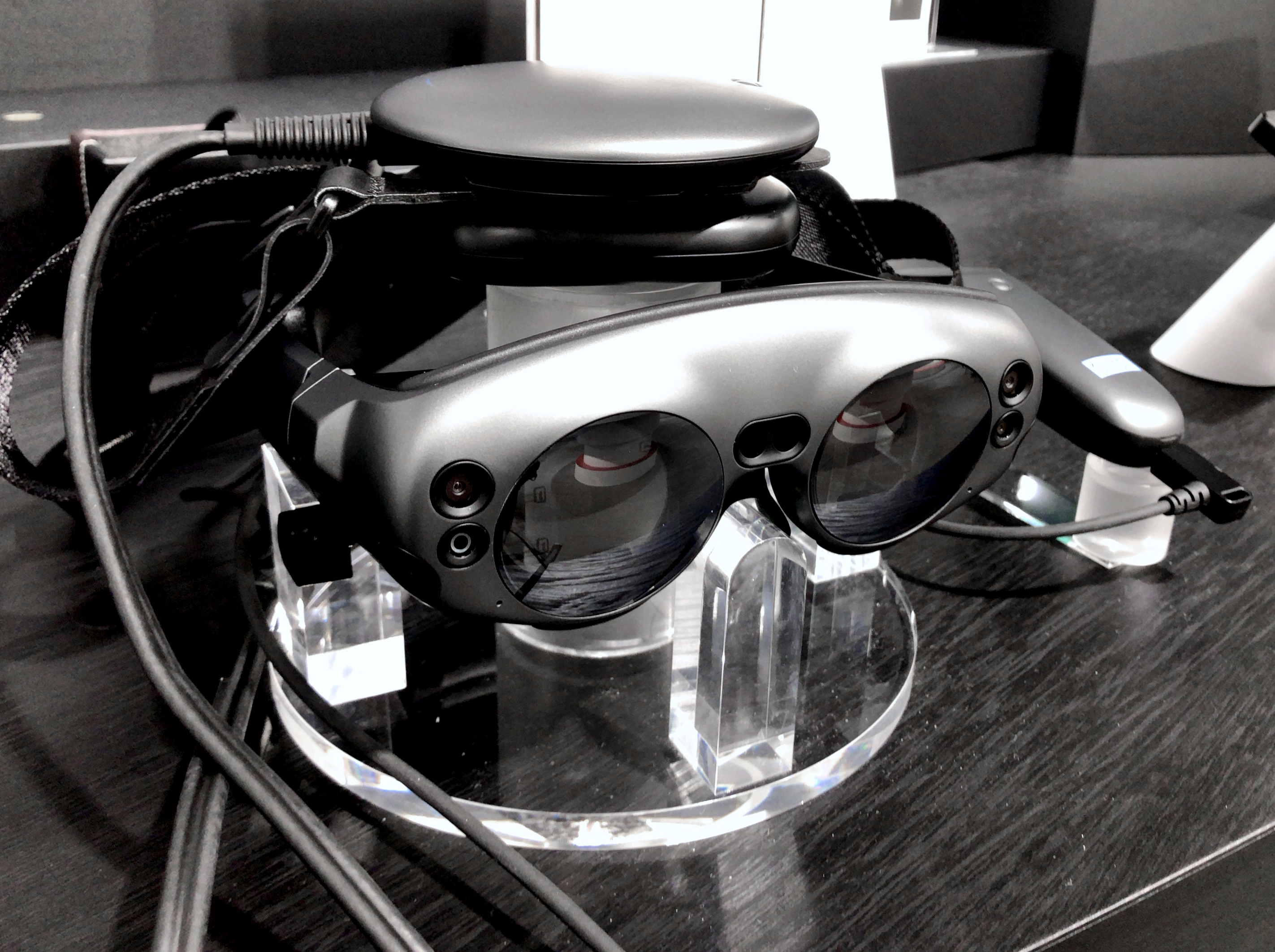
Magic Leap One headset

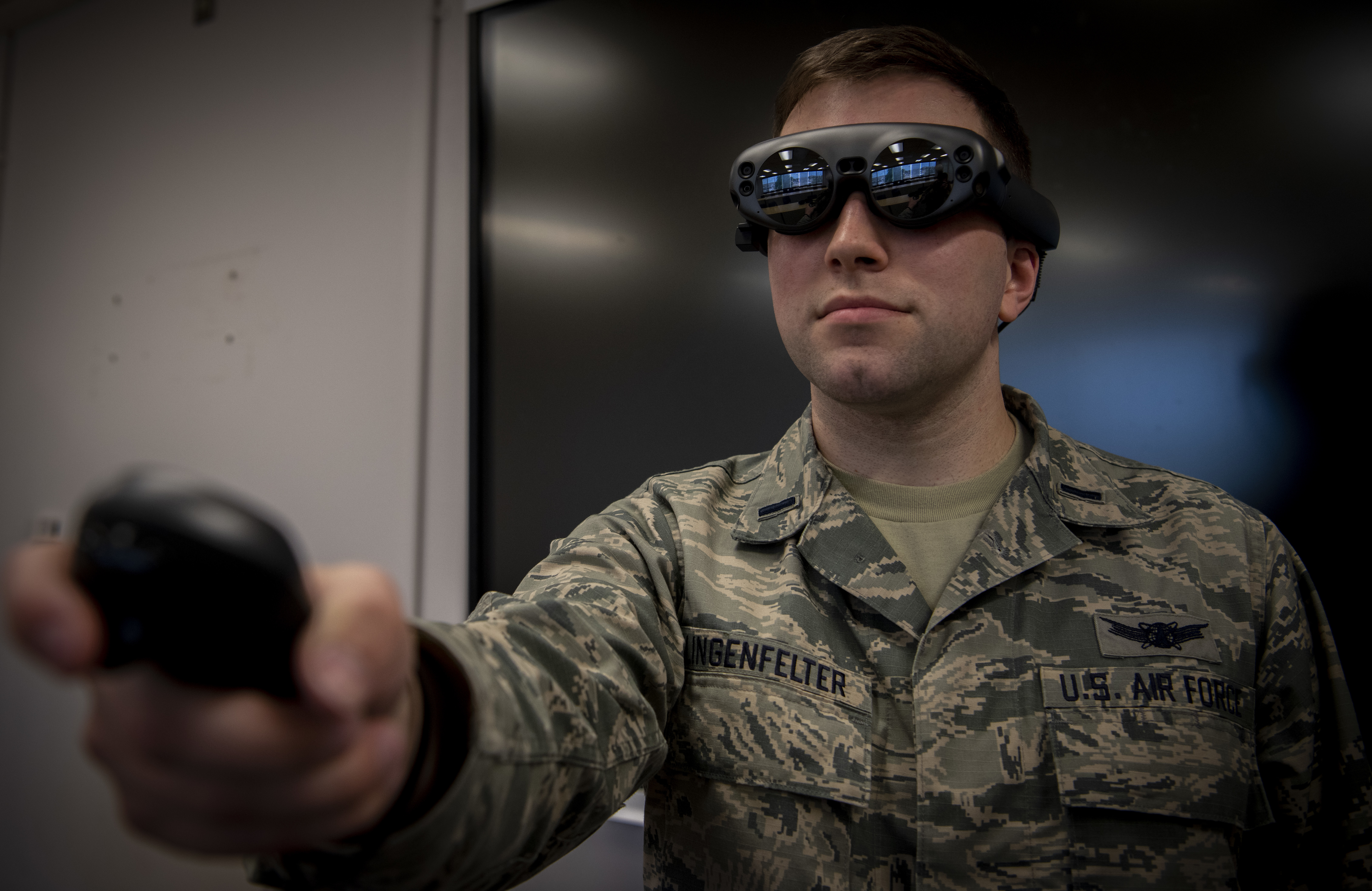
Magic Leap 1 headset being used

=== 2010–2014 ===
Magic Leap was founded by Rony Abovitz in 2010. The startup evolved from a company named "Magic Leap Studios" which around 2010 was working on a graphic novel and a feature film series, and in 2011 became a corporation, releasing an augmented reality app at Comic-Con that year. In October 2014, when the company was still operating in stealth mode (but already reported to be working on projects relating to augmented reality and computer vision), it raised more than $540 million of venture funding from Google, Qualcomm, Andreessen Horowitz and Kleiner Perkins, among other investors.

A November 2014 analysis by Gizmodo, based on job listings, trademark registrations and patent applications from Magic Leap, concluded that the company appeared to be building a competitor to the Google Glass and Oculus Rift that would "blend computer-generated graphics with the real world". It had also been compared to Microsoft HoloLens.

Before Magic Leap, a head-mounted display using light field had been demonstrated by Nvidia in 2013, and the MIT Media Lab has also constructed a 3D display using "compressed light fields"; however, Magic Leap asserts that it achieves better resolution with a new proprietary technique that projects an image directly onto the user's retina. According to a researcher who studied the company's patents, Magic Leap is likely to use stacked silicon waveguides.

Richard Taylor of special effects company Weta Workshop was briefly involved in Magic Leap alongside Abovitz. Science fiction author Neal Stephenson joined the company in December 2014. Graeme Devine is their Chief Creative Officer & Senior VP Games, Apps and Creative Experiences.

=== 2015–2018 ===
On October 20, 2015, Magic Leap released actual footage of their product. While still not showing any hardware, the footage claims that it was filmed through a Magic Leap device without the use of special effects or compositing.

On December 9, 2015, Forbes reported on documents filed in the state of Delaware, indicating a Series C funding round of $827m. This funding round could bring the company's total funding to $1.4 billion, and its post-money valuation to $3.7 billion. On February 2, 2016, it was reported that Magic Leap further raised another funding round of close to $800m, valuing it at $4.5 billion.

On June 16, 2016, Magic Leap announced a partnership with Disney's Lucasfilm and its ILMxLAB R&D unit. The two companies would form a joint research lab at Lucasfilm's San Francisco campus. In December 2016, Forbes estimated that Magic Leap was worth $4.5 billion. On July 11, 2018, AT&T invested in the company and became its exclusive partner. On August 8, 2018, the Magic Leap One was made available in the United States through AT&T.

On December 20, 2017, Magic Leap announced their first augmented reality headset, called Magic Leap One, to be shipped the following year.

On March 7, 2018, Magic Leap raised $461 million in Series D funding led by the Public Investment Fund of Saudi Arabia, the country's sovereign wealth fund.

In June 2018, the Magic Leap One was showcased online, only showing the device visually but not any of its functionality.

On July 1, 2018, the device was finally demoed, confirming its use of NVIDIA TX2 hardware. The general reaction was of disappointment with what was shown, based on what had been promised up to that point.

=== 2018–present ===
On July 11, 2018, AT&T invested in the company, set to become its exclusive partner. Also AT&T Communications' CEO John Donovan is set to become a board member of the company.

In April 2019, it was reported that Magic Leap had raised an additional $280 million from NTT Docomo as part of a partnership announced by the two companies.

In November 2019, it was reported that Magic Leap assigned all of its US patents to J.P. Morgan Chase in August 2019. The company also announced a significant financing round, which would become its series E when complete.

On April 22, 2020, Magic Leap indicated a major company restructuring and that half of the company's staff would be laid off due to the COVID-19 pandemic. Despite the job cuts, the company raised $350 million in May 2020.

On May 28, 2020, Rony Abovitz announced that Magic Leap had raised $350 million in new funding and that he would be stepping down as CEO. On July 7, 2020, the company announced their new CEO would be former Microsoft executive Peggy Johnson.

In September 2020, The Information reported that the company valuation was $6.4 billion in 2019 and by June 2020 it dropped to $450 million, by 93 percent in six months.

In October 2021, Venture Beat reported that the company's valuation was $2 billion after raising $500 million from an unidentified source and that the company would unveil the new Magic Leap 2 AR headset in 2022 (“select customers” are already using it in 2021 as part of an early access program).

In October 2021, Magic Leap's CEO announced Magic Leap 2 would be the "industry’s smallest and lightest device" for business uses, with a significantly larger field of view, and include a dimming feature to be used in brightly lit settings.

On September 30, 2022, Magic Leap officially released its latest AR Headset, the Magic Leap 2.

In July 2024, Magic Leap cut about 75 jobs, including its entire sales and marketing teams. The company is also partnering with Google.

By August 2024, Magic Leap had raised at least $3.5 billion, including $750 million from Saudi Arabia's Public Investment Fund.

On December 31, 2024, cloud services for Magic Leap 1 became no longer available, and core functionality reached end-of-life. As of December 2024, the Magic Leap One is no longer supported or working, becoming end of life and abruptly losing functionality when cloud access was ended. This happened whilst encouraging users to buy a newer model.

== Magic Leap 1 hardware ==
The Magic Leap 1 uses a liquid crystal on silicon (LCOS) display for each eye.

== Acquisitions ==
- April 18, 2016: Israeli cybersecurity company NorthBit.
- February 18, 2017: the 3D division of Swiss computer vision company Dacuda.
- Early 2018: military startup Chosen Realities.
- May 2019: Belgian startup Mimesys, developer of volumetric video conferencing software for the Magic Leap platform.

== See also ==
- CastAR
- Meta (augmented reality company)
