= Meta (augmented reality company) =

Defunct Silicon Valley company (2012–2019)

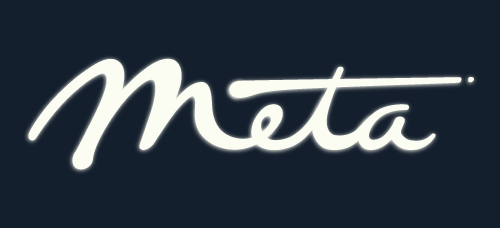
- Type: Private
- Founded: 2012
- Founder: Meron Gribetz, CEO
- Defunct: January 2019
- Fate: Insolvency
- Successor: Meta View (now Campfire)
- Key people: John Werner
- Products: Augmented reality products
- Website: metavision.com

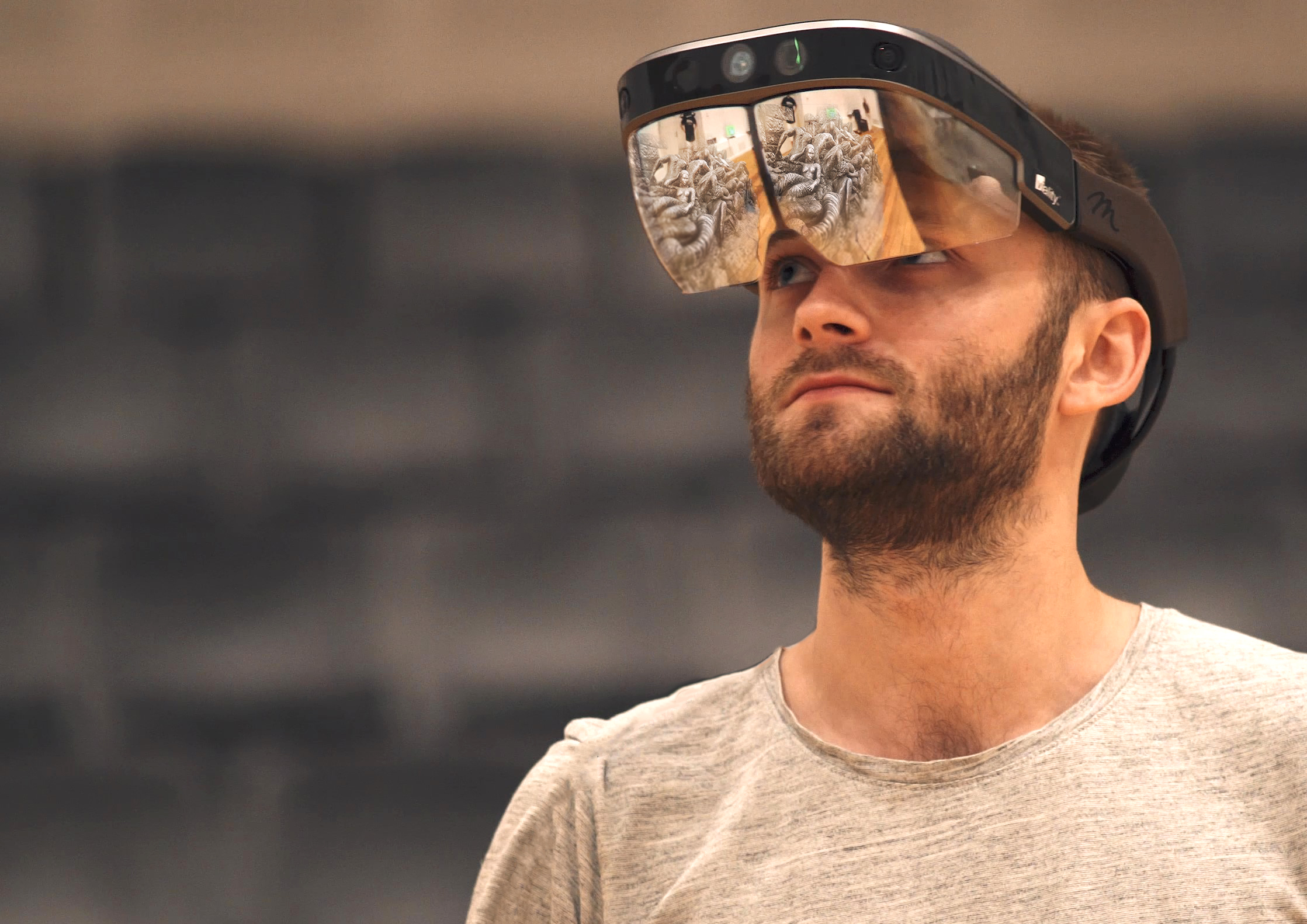
Meta 2 augmented reality headset from Meta

Meta was a company that designed augmented reality products. The company was founded by Meron Gribetz in 2012, based on the "Extramissive spatial imaging digital eye glass" technology invented by Gribetz and Steve Mann originally filed with the US Patent and Trademark office Jan 3, 2013.

The company furloughed two-thirds of its approximately 100 employees in September 2018. In 2019, the company declared itself insolvent after its primary lender foreclosed and sold all of the company's assets.

== Products ==
The company's products included the Meta 1 and Meta 2 Developer Kits, headsets with which users could view and manipulate computer-generated images using optical see-through displays.

== History ==
Meta was founded by Meron Gribetz while he was a student at Columbia University. In 2013, Meta launched a crowd-funded Kickstarter campaign that raised $194,444. Also in 2013, Meta was accepted into the Y Combinator's seed accelerator program. Steve Mann became the company's chief scientist and Steven Feiner became an adviser.

In 2014, founder Gribetz was awarded the "30 Under 30 award" in the technology category by Forbes and Meta won best heads-up display award for the Meta Pro at the Consumer Electronics Show. Meta presented the Meta 1 Developer Kit with a live medical demo at 2014's TechCrunch Disrupt in San Francisco.

In September 2014, Meta began to ship its Meta 1 Developer Kit.

In 2015, Meta raised a $23 million Series-A round from Horizons Ventures, Tim Draper, BOE Optoelectronics, Garry Tan and Alexis Ohanian of Y Combinator, Danhua Capital, Commodore Partners, and Vegas Tech Fund.

In 2016, Meta unveiled its second-generation product at a TED conference. The company received another $50M in venture-capital funds from Lenovo, Tencent, Banyan Capital, Comcast Ventures, and GQY.

In March 2016, it announced the launch of the Meta 2 at the $949 to compete with the Microsoft HoloLens, which retailed for $3000. However, the Meta 2 would be a tethered and would require an external PC whereas the Hololens was a standalone product.

In 2018, Meta furloughed two-thirds of its one hundred employees after it failed to secure another round of venture capital funding. In January 2019, Meta declared itself insolvent after its primary lender foreclosed and sold all the company's assets.

In May 2019, a company called Meta View announced it had acquired the intellectual property assets of Meta, with Jay Wright, who was previously president and general manager of Qualcomm's augmented reality division, Vuforia, chosen as CEO. In July 2021, the company announced a new name, Campfire, and its plans to release a 3D collaboration system for design and engineering later that year.

== See also ==
- Magic Leap
