= John Stasko =

- Born: August 28, 1961 (age 65); Miami, FL, US
- Education: Brown University, Bucknell University
- Known for: Algorithm animation, software visualization, information visualization, visual analytics
- Scientific career
- Fields: information visualization, cisual analytics, human-computer interaction
- Workplaces: Georgia Institute of Technology, School of Interactive Computing, GVU Center
- Doctoral advisor: Steve Reiss
- Doctoral students: W. Keith Edwards

John Thomas Stasko III (born August 28, 1961) is a Regents Professor in the School of Interactive Computing in the College of Computing at Georgia Tech, where he joined the faculty in 1989. He also is one of the founding members of the Graphics, Visualization, and Usability (GVU) Center there. Stasko is best known for his extensive research in information visualization and visual analytics, including his earlier work in software visualization and algorithm animation.

== Early life and education ==
John Stasko was born on August 28, 1961, in Miami, Florida. As a youngster, he lived in Pennsylvania (Lancaster and Reading) and south Florida (Miami, Boca Raton, and Deerfield Beach). Stasko attended Bucknell University and graduated summa cum laude with a B.S. in Mathematics in 1983. He went directly to graduate school and earned an Sc.M. and Ph.D. in Computer Science at Brown University in 1985 and 1989, respectively. His doctoral thesis, "TANGO: A Framework and System for Algorithm Animation," is a highly cited project in the area of Software Visualization. Stasko joined the faculty of the College of Computing at Georgia Tech in 1989. He and his wife Christine have three children, John IV (Tommy), Mitchell, and Audrey. Stasko is an avid golfer and was winner of the 1996 Bobby Jones Memorial Tournament at East Lake Golf Club in Atlanta.

== Professional career ==
Upon joining the faculty at Georgia Tech, Stasko continued his research in algorithm animation and software visualization. He was the lead editor on the 1998 MIT Press book Software Visualization: Programming as a Multimedia Experience, generally considered the lead reference for that field. Stasko also was one of the founding faculty for the GVU Center at Georgia Tech.

In the late 1990s, his research broadened into other areas of human-computer interaction and he developed a specific focus on information visualization. He formed the Information Interfaces Research Group which he still directs. More recently, Stasko has been a pioneering researcher in the new field of visual analytics, and was a contributor to the 2005 book, Illuminating the Path, that laid out a research agenda for this field.

Stasko has published extensively in these fields, including over 125 conference papers (two Best Papers Awards), journal articles, and book chapters. His research in information visualization spans a spectrum from theoretical work on interaction, evaluation, and the conceptual foundations of visualization to more applied work creating new techniques and systems (such as TANGO, POLKA, SunBurst, InfoCanvas, Jigsaw) for people in a variety of domains. He was Papers Co-Chair for the IEEE Information Visualization (InfoVis) Symposium in 2005 and 2006 and for the IEEE Visual Analytics Science and Technology (VAST) Symposium in 2009. He is currently on Steering Committee of the IEEE InfoVis Conference, the ACM Symposium on Software Visualization, and is an At Large member of the IEEE Visualization and Graphics Technical Committee.

In 2007, Stasko was appointed Associate Chair of the newly created School of Interactive Computing at Georgia Tech. In addition to this role, he leads the Information Interfaces Research Group where he advises undergraduate, master's, and doctoral students. He traditionally teaches CS 1331, an introductory object-oriented programming course and CS 7450, Information Visualization, which originated in 1999 and is one of the first courses on this topic in the world.

== Recognition ==
Stasko was named to the 2014 class of IEEE Fellows, "for contributions to information visualization, visual analytics and human-computer interaction."

He was inducted into the CHI Academy in 2016 for making significant, cumulative contributions to the development of the field of human–computer interaction.

Finally, Stasko was named to the 2022 class of ACM Fellows, "for contributions to the design, analysis, usage, and evaluation of software and information visualization".

== Selected bibliography ==
- John Stasko, Carsten Gorg, and Zhicheng Liu, "Jigsaw: Supporting Investigative Analysis through Interactive Visualization", Information Visualization, Vol. 7, No. 2, Summer 2008, pp. 118–132.
- Zachary Pousman, John T. Stasko and Michael Mateas, "Casual Information Visualization: Depictions of Data in Everyday Life", IEEE Transactions on Visualization and Computer Graphics, (Paper presented at InfoVis '07), Vol. 13, No. 6, November/December 2007, pp. 1145–1152.
- Ji Soo Yi, Youn ah Kang, John T. Stasko and Julie A. Jacko, "Toward a Deeper Understanding of the Role of Interaction in Information Visualization", IEEE Transactions on Visualization and Computer Graphics, (Paper presented at InfoVis '07), Vol. 13, No. 6, November/December 2007, pp. 1224–1231.
- Zach Pousman and John Stasko, "A Taxonomy of Ambient Information Systems: Four Patterns of Design", Proceedings of Advanced Visual Interfaces (AVI 2006), Venice, Italy, May 2006, pp. 67–74.
- Robert Amar, and John Stasko, "Knowledge Precepts for Design and Evaluation of Information Visualizations," IEEE Transactions on Visualization and Computer Graphics, Vol. 11, No. 4, July/August 2005, pp. 432–442.
- John Stasko, Todd Miller, Zachary Pousman, Christopher Plaue, and Osman Ullah, "Personalized Peripheral Information Awareness through Information Art", Proceedings of UbiComp '04, Nottingham, U.K., September 2004, pp. 18–35.
- Christopher Hundhausen, Sarah Douglas, and John Stasko, "A Meta-Study of Algorithm Visualization Effectiveness", Journal of Visual Languages and Computing, Vol. 13, No. 3, June 2002, pp. 259–290.
- Stasko, John T. and Zhang, Eugene, "Focus+Context Display and Navigation Techniques for Enhancing Radial, Space-Filling Hierarchy Visualizations", Proceedings of IEEE Information Visualization 2000, Salt Lake City, UT, October 2000, pp. 57–65.
- John Stasko, John Domingue, Marc H. Brown, Marc and Blaine Price,(editors), Software Visualization: Programming as a Multimedia Experience, MIT Press, Cambridge, MA, 1998.
- Stasko, John T., "TANGO: A Framework and System for Algorithm Animation", IEEE Computer, Vol. 23, No. 9, September 1990, pp. 27–39.
