= Elizabeth Mynatt =

American computer scientist (born 1966)

Elizabeth D. Mynatt
- Born: July 12, 1966 (age 60); Knoxville, Tennessee, US
- Education: Georgia Institute of Technology, North Carolina State University
- Known for: health informatics, ubiquitous computing, assistive technology
- Awards: Sloan Fellowship, NSF Career award, CHI Academy, American Academy of Arts and Sciences
- Scientific career
- Fields: Human-Computer Interaction, Ubiquitous Computing, Health Informatics, Human-Centered Computing
- Workplaces: Georgia Tech, GVU Center, Northeastern University
- Doctoral advisor: James Foley

Elizabeth D. "Beth" Mynatt (born July 12, 1966) is the Dean of the Khoury College of Computer Sciences at Northeastern University. She is former executive director of the Institute for People and Technology, director of the GVU Center at Georgia Tech, and Regents' and Distinguished Professor in the School of Interactive Computing, all at the Georgia Institute of Technology. In 2024, she was elected into the prestigious American Academy of Arts and Sciences.

She is best known for her research in the fields of human-computer interaction, ubiquitous computing, health informatics, and assistive technology. She pioneered creating nonspeech auditory interfaces from graphical interfaces to enable blind computer users to work with modern computer applications. From 2001 to 2005, she was selected to be the associate director of the GVU Center at Georgia Tech, and in 2005 she was appointed director. Her current research explores the implications and opportunities stemming from the pervasive presence of computation in the informal activities of everyday life.

== Early life and education ==
Mynatt was born in Knoxville, Tennessee. She attended North Carolina State University for her undergraduate studies, graduating summa cum laude with a Bachelor of Science degree in computer science in 1988. She received a master's degree in 1989 in Information and Computer Science at the Georgia Institute of Technology. Mynatt went on to receive a Ph.D. at the Georgia Institute of Technology in 1995 in Computer Science where she was advised by James D. Foley. Her thesis, "Audio GUIs: Transforming Graphical User Interfaces into Auditory Interfaces", was a system which transformed applications into auditory interfaces to enable people to experience what interacting with graphical interfaces might be like for a blind user.

== Career ==
Upon graduation from Georgia Tech, Mynatt accepted a position as a member of the Research Staff at Xerox PARC. In 1998 she returned to Georgia Tech as an assistant professor and in 2002 became associate professor. From 2004 to 2005 she was director of the Aware Home Research Initiative, from 2006 to 2007 was the associate director of the Health Systems Institute, and from 2005 to 2011 directed the GVU Center at Georgia Tech.

She also directed the research program in Everyday Computing, examining the human-computer interface implications of having computation continuously present in many aspects of everyday life. Themes in her research include supporting informal collaboration and awareness in office environments, enabling creative work and visual communication, and augmenting social processes for managing personal information. Mynatt is one of the principal researchers in the Aware Home Research Initiative; investigating the design of future home technologies, especially those that enable older adults to continue living independently as opposed to moving to an institutional care setting.

In home environments, she is interested in using computing technology to increase the independence and capabilities of people and families for domains such as chronic health care, aging in place, and cognitive prosthetics. In office environments, she is interested in supporting fluid collaboration practices by leveraging the integrated design of physical and digital spaces and services with social practices surrounding information sharing.

Mynatt has taught courses in Human-Computer Interaction, Everyday Computing, Mobile and Ubuquitous Computing, and Media Computation. For seven years (2000–07) she played a leadership role in the design and management of two new programs: the Ph.D. in Human-Centered Computing and the M.S. program in Human-Computer Interaction. For the HCC Ph.D. program, she co-chaired the first formative committee that charted the possibilities for a new human-centric Ph.D. program, and directed the HCC program from its inception until the fall of 2006. She has published over 100 book chapters, conference publications, and journal articles in top tier locations such as ACM SIGCHI, CSCW, Ubicomp, and Pervasive.

Mynatt is an internationally recognized expert in the areas of ubiquitous computing and assistive technologies. She is a Sloan Research Fellow, and her research is supported by multiple grants from the National Science Foundation, including a five-year NSF CAREER award and a two-year IBM Faculty Partnership Award. She was recently awarded a Google Research Award for studying individual approaches to management of diabetes and she has also received awards from IBM, NASA, the NSF, and Siemens. Other honorary awards include the 2001 College of Computing's Junior Faculty Research award and the 2003 College of Computing's Dean's Award. Her work in healthcare has led to invited lectures at Google, Cornell University, and IBM Research among others.

Mynatt served as program chair for CHI 2010, the ACM Conference on Human Factors in Computing Systems, as well as conference chair for ICAD, UIST, and Ubicomp. She has published dozens of scholarly articles in peer reviewed journals and has given invited presentations at academic conferences such as CHI and Ubicomp. She has over 80 publications in the ACM Digital Library with over 6,000 downloads in the past year. Her visionary article "Charting past, present, and future research in ubiquitous computing" has been cited over 900 times. She has been quoted in a number of major newspapers, including The Washington Post, The Wall Street Journal, and the Atlanta Journal-Constitution. Mynatt is a member of numerous academic journals and professional societies, including IEEE and ACM. She has held membership on a number of Georgia Tech committees, including the Dean Search Committee, the Dean's Executive Council, the Graduate Committee, and Faculty Program Coordinator for the HCC PhD and MS HCI programs. She holds four patents for her work in user interfaces and audio systems.

In 2015 she was named a fellow of the Association for Computing Machinery "for contributions to human-centered computing and to the development of health information technologies." She was named to the 2021 class of Fellows of the American Association for the Advancement of Science.

In January 2022, she was appointed Dean of the Khoury College for Computer Sciences at Northeastern University. Mynatt introduced an Ethical Oath for Computer Professionals, authored by her, at the Khoury College graduation ceremony that year. Since 2022, all Khoury College graduating students are instructed to “adopt and recite” the oath as a required tenet of matriculation.

== Selected publications ==
- Charting past, present, and future research in ubiquitous computing with Gregory Abowd, (2000)
- The Aware Home: A Living Laboratory for Ubiquitous Computing Research (1999)
- Digital family portraits: supporting peace of mind for extended family members (2001)
- Increasing Opportunities for Aging in Place (2000)

== Personal life ==
Mynatt was previously married to Mark Bumgardner. She is now married to Blair MacIntyre. They have two children.
