= Irfan Essa =

American academic

- Education: MIT
- Known for: facial recognition, video stabilization, computational photography, computational journalism
- Scientific career
- Fields: Computer vision, computational journalism, machine learning, computer graphics, robotics
- Workplaces: Georgia Tech; GVU Center
- Thesis: Analysis, interpretation and synthesis of facial expressions (1995)
- Doctoral advisor: Alex Pentland
- Website: prof.irfanessa.com

Irfan Aziz Essa is a professor in the School of Interactive Computing of the College of Computing, and adjunct professor in the School of Electrical and Computer Engineering at the Georgia Institute of Technology (Georgia Tech). He is an associate dean in Georgia Tech's College of Computing and the director of the new Interdisciplinary Research Center for Machine Learning at Georgia Tech (ML@GT).

== Education ==
Essa obtained his undergraduate degree in engineering at the Illinois Institute of Technology in 1988. Following this, Essa attended the Massachusetts Institute of Technology, where he received his magister scientiae (Master of Science) in 1990 and his Ph.D. in 1995 at the MIT Media Lab. His doctoral research focused on the implementation of a system to detect emotions from changes in your facial expression, which was later featured in the New York Times. He proceeded to hold a position as a research scientist at MIT from 1994 to 1996 before accepting a position at Georgia Tech.

== Professional career ==
Essa's work focuses mainly in the areas of computer vision, computational photography, computer graphics and animation, robotics, computational perception, human-computer interaction, machine learning, computational journalism and artificial intelligence.

After departing MIT, Essa accepted a position as an assistant professor in the College of Computing at Georgia Tech. Today, he holds the position of a professor, and continues his research endeavors alongside his teaching career.

Essa has taught various courses over the years on digital video special effects, computer vision, computational journalism and computational photography. In the spring of 2013, Essa taught a free online course on computational photography, on the MOOC platform Coursera. He is affiliated with the GVU Center and RIM@GT, and is one of the faculty members of the Computational Perception Laboratory at Georgia Tech.

In addition to this, Essa has organized the Computational Journalism Symposium both in 2008 and 2013. He is credited, alongside his doctoral student Nick Diakopoulos, with coining the term computational journalism back in 2006, when they taught the first class on the subject.

Most recently, Essa has worked as a researcher / consultant with Google to develop a video stabilization algorithm alongside two of his doctoral students, Matthias Grundmann and Vivek Kwatra, which now runs on YouTube, and allows users to stabilize their uploaded videos in real-time.

== Selected bibliography ==
- Kwatra, Vivek, Arno Schödl, Irfan Essa, Greg Turk, and Aaron Bobick. "Graphcut textures: image and video synthesis using graph cuts." In ACM Transactions on Graphics, vol. 22, no. 3, pp. 277–286. ACM, 2003.
- Kidd, Cory D., Robert Orr, Gregory D. Abowd, Christopher G. Atkeson, Irfan A. Essa, Blair MacIntyre, Elizabeth Mynatt, Thad E. Starner, and Wendy Newstetter. "The aware home: A living laboratory for ubiquitous computing research." In Cooperative buildings. Integrating information, organizations, and architecture, pp. 191–198. Springer Berlin Heidelberg, 1999.
- Essa, Irfan A., and Alex Paul Pentland. "Coding, analysis, interpretation, and recognition of facial expressions." IEEE Transactions on Pattern Analysis and Machine Intelligence 19, no. 7 (1997): 757-763.
- Schödl, Arno, Richard Szeliski, David H. Salesin, and Irfan Essa. "Video textures." In Proceedings of the 27th annual conference on Computer graphics and interactive techniques, pp. 489–498. ACM Press/Addison-Wesley Publishing Co., 2000.
- Kwatra, Vivek, Irfan Essa, Aaron Bobick, and Nipun Kwatra. "Texture optimization for example-based synthesis." In ACM Transactions on Graphics, vol. 24, no. 3, pp. 795–802. ACM, 2005.
- Essa, Irfan Aziz, and Alex P. Pentland. "Facial expression recognition using a dynamic model and motion energy." In Computer Vision, 1995. Proceedings., Fifth International Conference on, pp. 360–367. IEEE, 1995.
- Moore, Darnell J., Irfan A. Essa, and Monson H. Hayes III. "Exploiting human actions and object context for recognition tasks." In Computer Vision, 1999. The Proceedings of the Seventh IEEE International Conference on, vol. 1, pp. 80–86. IEEE, 1999.
- Basu, Sumit, Irfan Essa, and Alex Pentland. "Motion regularization for model-based head tracking." In Pattern Recognition, 1996., Proceedings of the 13th International Conference on, vol. 3, pp. 611–616. IEEE, 1996.
- Haro, Antonio, Myron Flickner, and Irfan Essa. "Detecting and tracking eyes by using their physiological properties, dynamics, and appearance." In Computer Vision and Pattern Recognition, 2000. Proceedings. IEEE Conference on, vol. 1, pp. 163–168. IEEE, 2000.
- Mynatt, Elizabeth D., Irfan Essa, and Wendy Rogers. "Increasing the opportunities for aging in place." In Proceedings on the 2000 conference on Universal Usability, pp. 65–71. ACM, 2000.
- Grundmann, Matthias, Vivek Kwatra, Mei Han, and Irfan Essa. "Efficient hierarchical graph-based video segmentation." In Computer Vision and Pattern Recognition (CVPR), 2010 IEEE Conference on, pp. 2141–2148. IEEE, 2010.
- Grundmann, Matthias, Vivek Kwatra, and Irfan Essa. "Auto-directed video stabilization with robust L1 optimal camera paths." In Computer Vision and Pattern Recognition (CVPR), 2011 IEEE Conference on, pp. 225–232. IEEE, 2011.
