= Cindy Grimm =

American computer scientist, roboticist, and mechanical engineer

Cindy Marie Grimm is an American computer scientist, roboticist, and mechanical engineer. She is a professor in the School of Mechanical, Industrial, and Manufacturing Engineering at Oregon State University.

== Research ==
Topics in Grimm's current research include robot grasping and issues of ethics and privacy in robotics, including the ethical implications of autonomous drones and self-driving cars. Her past work has included research on the shape of ferret brains, using bat sonar techniques to develop robot sensors, and augmenting medical information with visual cues modeled after those in classical paintings, to guide non-expert viewers along the sight lines chosen by experts. She has also published highly cited work in volume segmentation, computational topology, shape comparison, and the modeling and synthesis of human facial expressions.

== Education and career ==
Grimm grew up on the San Francisco Peninsula, where her parents were educators and later educational software developers. She graduated from the University of California, Berkeley in 1990 with a double major in art and computer science, and completed a Ph.D. at Brown University in 1996, working in computer graphics there with John F. Hughes. Her dissertation was Modeling Surfaces of Arbitrary Topology using Manifolds.

After postdoctoral research at Brown and at Microsoft Research, she became an assistant professor of computer science and engineering at the School of Engineering at Washington University in St. Louis in 2000. She moved to the School of Mechanical, Industrial, and Manufacturing Engineering at Oregon State University as a research associate professor in 2012, became a regular-rank associate professor in 2015, and was promoted to full professor in 2020.

== Personal life ==
Grimm is married to Bill Smart, also on the faculty of Mechanical, Industrial, and Manufacturing Engineering at Oregon State; they met as graduate students at Brown University while sparring in a hapkido course taught by Grimm. Grimm and Smart also continue to work together in the martial arts, as co-owners of a dojo in Corvallis, Oregon.
