= Henrik I. Christensen =

Danish roboticist and professor

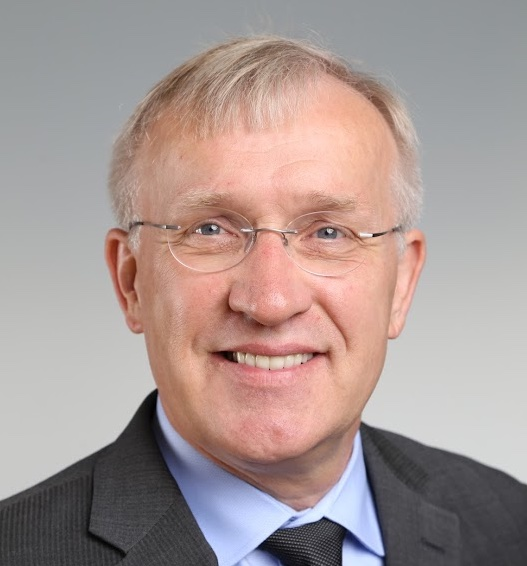
- Christensen in 2021
- Born: July 16, 1962 (age 64); Frederikshavn, Denmark
- Citizenship: United States of America
- Education: Aalborg University
- Scientific career
- Fields: Robotics
- Workplaces: University of California, San Diego
- Doctoral advisor: Erik Granum

Henrik Iskov Christensen (born July 16, 1962 in Frederikshavn, Denmark) is a Danish roboticist and Professor of Computer Science at Dept. of Computer Science and Engineering, at the UC San Diego Jacobs School of Engineering. He is also the Director of the Contextual Robotics Institute at UC San Diego.

Before UC San Diego, he was a Distinguished Professor of Computer Science in the School of Interactive Computing at the Georgia Institute of Technology. At Georgia Tech, Christensen served as the founding director of the Institute for Robotics and Intelligent Machines (IRIM@GT) and the KUKA Chair of Robotics.

Previously, Christensen was the Founding Chairman of European Robotics Research Network (EURON) and an IEEE Robotics and Automation Society Distinguished Lecturer in Robotics.

== Biography ==
Christensen received his Certificate of Apprenticeship in Mechanical Engineering from the Frederikshavn Technical School, Denmark in 1981. He received his M.Sc. and Ph.D. in Electrical Engineering from Aalborg University in 1987 and 1990, respectively. His doctoral thesis Aspects of Real Time Image Sequence Analysis was advised by Erik Granum.

After receiving his Ph.D., Christensen held teaching and research positions at Aalborg University, Oak Ridge National Laboratory, and the Royal Institute of Technology. In 2006, Christensen accepted a part-time position at the Georgia Institute of Technology as a Distinguished Professor of Computer Science and the KUKA Chair of Robotics, and transitioned to full-time in early 2007. At Georgia Tech, Christensen served as the founding director of the Center for Robotics and Intelligent Machines (RIM@GT), an interdepartmental research units consists of the College of Computing, College of Engineering, and the Georgia Tech Research Institute (GTRI). During his tenure, RIM@GT experienced an unprecedented growth, including (as of 2008) 36 faculty members as well as a dedicated interdisciplinary Ph.D. program in Robotics.

He joined UC San Diego the fall of 2016 to be the director of the UC San Diego Contextual Robotics Institute. The institute does research on robots in the context of empowering people in their daily lives from work over leisure to domestic tasks. An important consideration is the context in which the robot is to perform its tasks.

He was named the inaugural Temasek Fellow April 2025.

== Research ==
He performs research on robotics, computer vision, and artificial intelligence and has published more than 400 contributions at major conferences and journals.

=== DARPA Urban Grand Challenge ===
In 2007, Christensen led Georgia Tech's team in the DARPA Urban Grand Challenge as the principal investigator. The 2007 UGC was the third installment of the DARPA Grand Challenges (in 2004 and 2005), and took place on November 3, 2007 at the site of the now-closed George Air Force Base (currently used as Southern California Logistics Airport), in Victorville, California. The course involved a 96 km (60 mi) urban area course, to be completed in less than 6 hours while obeying all traffic regulations.

=== Professional activities ===
- Associate Editor of Journal of Machine Vision and Applications, Springer Verlag (1996–2004).
- Associate Editor of International Journal of Pattern Recognition and Artificial Intelligence, World Scientific Press (1997–2005)
- Associate Editor of MIT Press series on "Intelligent Robotics and Autonomous Agents", (1997–)
- Associate Editor of IEEE Transactions on Pattern Analysis and Machine Intelligence (1999–2003)
- Associate Editor of Robotics and Autonomous Systems journal, Elsevier, Competition Corner, (1999–2002)
- Associate Editor of AAAI AI Magazine (2000–2007)
- Associate Editor of Springer Series on "Springer Tracts in Advanced Robotics", (2001–2020)
- Associate Editor of The International Journal of Robotics Research, (2002–2024)
- Associate Editor of Service Robotics, (2005–)

=== Patents ===
- Robotic destination dispatch system for elevators and methods for making and using same, S. Park, M. Bray, A. Cosgun & H. I. Christensen, US Patent (US20190345000A1), 18 May 2018
- Optical measurement of drilled holes, H. Bergman, H. I. Christensen & K. Hatzilias, US Patent (US8842273B2), 23 Sep 2014
- Position Estimation Method, H.I. Christensen & G. Zunino, World patent (WO03062937) 3 March, 2008
- Förfarande för en anordning på hjul, G. Zunino & H.I. Christensen, Swedish Patent (SE0200197) Mobile Robot, P. Jensfelt & H.I. Christensen, World Patent.

== Honors and awards ==
- The Foundation Vision North 1991 Research Award. Awarded for contribution to advancement of research at the Laboratory of Image Analysis, Aalborg University. August 1991.
- Elected Officer of International Foundation of Robotics Research (2003–)
- IEEE RAS Distinguished Lecturer in Robotics (2004–2006)
- Engelberger Award for Education (2011)
- Boeing Supplier of the Year 2011
- AAAS Fellow, (2013-)
- Temasek Fellow (2025-)
