= Joshua Yuan =

Joshua Yuan may refer to:

- Joshua Yuan (engineer)
- Joshua Yuan (badminton)
