= Lauren Wilcox =

American professor and researcher

Lauren G. Wilcox
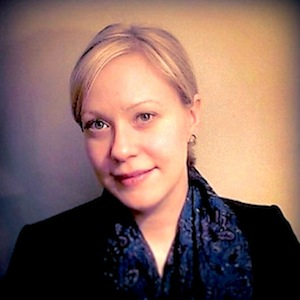
- Born: New York City, US
- Other name: Lauren Wilcox-Patterson
- Education: Columbia University
- Known for: Responsible AI, Human-Computer Interaction, Health Informatics
- Scientific career
- Fields: Computer Science
- Workplaces: Georgia Tech, Google, Columbia University, Microsoft Research, IBM Research
- Thesis: User Interfaces for Patient-Centered Communication of Health Status and Care Progress (2013)
- Doctoral advisor: Steven K. Feiner

Lauren G. Wilcox (Lauren G. Wilcox-Patterson) is an American professor and researcher in responsible AI, human–computer interaction, and health informatics, known for research on enabling community participation in technology design and development and her prior contributions to health informatics systems.

== Education ==
Wilcox earned her Ph.D. in Computer Science from Columbia University in 2013, collaborating closely with graduate students and faculty in the Department of Biomedical Informatics and the Columbia University Irving Medical Center. She holds a B.S. and an M.S. in Computer Science, both from Columbia University, which she earned before returning for her Ph.D.

== Career ==
Prior to her research career, Wilcox was a Staff Software Engineer at IBM in Austin, Texas and was recognized as an Early Tenure Inventor. After completing her Ph.D., Wilcox joined the Georgia Institute of Technology School of Interactive Computing and was promoted to associate professor with tenure in April 2020.

She is a Senior Staff Research Scientist and Group Manager in Responsible AI and Human-Centered Technology at Google. She directed the Health Experience and Applications Lab at Georgia Tech. At Georgia Tech, Wilcox expanded her research scope to focus on how computing technology can meet the health needs of adolescents, including adolescent chronic condition management and adolescent health data privacy. She has also contributed foundational studies on how computing systems can support mental well-being, and the consideration of human well-being as an integral part of technology design.

Wilcox was an inaugural member of the ACM Future of Computing Academy (ACM FCA) and co-authored an ACM FCA blog post in 2018, urging the computing research community to leverage the peer review process to identify and address the broader impacts of computing advancements on society. Since the publication of the blog post, there have been examples of computing conferences requiring authors to submit statements on the broader impacts of their contributions.

Wilcox joined Google in 2019, where she contributed to one of the first published studies examining the use of a deep learning-based AI system in patient care.

In 2023, she was elected an ACM Distinguished Member.
