= John F. Hughes =

American computer scientist

- Education: U.C. Berkeley, Princeton
- Known for: Computer graphics textbooks
- Scientific career
- Fields: Computer graphics
- Workplaces: Brown University
- Thesis: Invariants of Regular Homotopy and Bordism of Low Dimensional Immersions (1982)
- Doctoral advisor: Robion Kirby
- Doctoral students: Cindy Grimm, Lee Markosian, Morgan McGuire, Tomer Moscovich, Olga Karpenko

John F. "Spike" Hughes is a Professor of Computer Science at Brown University.

== Contributions ==
Hughes' research is in computer graphics, particularly those aspects of graphics involving substantial mathematics. He is perhaps best known as the co-author of many widely used textbooks in the field of computer graphics.

Hughes is an avid sailor, and for years maintained the FAQ for the Usenet rec.boats group.

== Selected publications ==
- Foley, James; A. van Dam; S. Feiner; J. Hughes (1995). C Edition, Interactive Computer Graphics: Principles and Practice. Reading, MA, USA: Addison-Wesley. p. 1174.
- Foley, James; A. van Dam; S. Feiner; J. Hughes; R. Phillips (1993). Introduction to Computer Graphics. Reading, MA, USA: Addison-Wesley. p. 559.
- Foley, James; A. van Dam; S. Feiner; J. Hughes (1990). Interactive Computer Graphics: Principles and Practice. Reading, MA, USA: Addison-Wesley. p. 1174.
