= W. Keith Edwards =

American computer scientist

- Born: Fredericksburg, Virginia, United States
- Education: Georgia Institute of Technology
- Scientific career
- Fields: Human-computer interaction Computer supported cooperative work
- Workplaces: PARC; Georgia Institute of Technology; GVU Center
- Doctoral advisor: John Stasko

W. Keith Edwards is a professor in the School of Interactive Computing at the Georgia Institute of Technology (Georgia Tech) and Director of the GVU Center at Georgia Tech.

Edwards’ research lies generally in the fields of human-computer interaction (HCI) and computer-supported cooperative work (CSCW). He has chaired and published papers in top-tier academic conferences in these fields.

== Early life and education ==
Edwards was born in Fredericksburg, Virginia, USA and grew up in Chattanooga, Tennessee, USA. After finishing High School, Edwards completed a B.S. in Information and Computer Science, a M.S. in Information and Computer Science and a Ph.D. in Computer Science at the Georgia Institute of Technology. During his graduate career, Edwards interned at Sun Microsystems and Olivetti Research Center.

As a graduate student, Edwards was influenced by Saul Greenberg, whose work in Computer Supported Cooperative Work spoke to his own interest of understanding how what is written into the infrastructure of a software systems and its services effects the human interaction possibilities. Edwards’ graduate research culminated with his dissertation, titled “Coordination Infrastructure in Collaborative Systems.”

== Career ==
Upon receiving his Ph.D. Edwards spent nine years in the Computer Science Laboratory at Xerox PARC, initially as a member of research staff and ending his career there as Manager of the Ubiquitous Computing group. While at PARC Edwards wrote Core Jini, an authoritative text for implementing Jini based systems.

During his tenure as manager, his group conducted a study of iTunes use, and the zeroconf discovery protocols it relies on, in the workplace whose results were reported in The Washington Post, the San Francisco Chronicle, and other major news agencies. A key finding from this study was that discovery protocols do not just connect content, but connect people as well.

Since arriving at Georgia Tech, Edwards has founded and continues to lead the Pixi Lab. Research from the Pixi lab has received honors including a CHI Best Paper award. Edwards also served as Technical Program Chair for the ACM CHI conference 2010 and is currently serving as a member of Microsoft Corporation's Trustworthy Computing Advisory Board. Keith also teaches a class on User Interface Software to undergraduate and graduate students.
