= Andrea Grimes Parker =

American computer scientist and academic

- Born: Andrea Elaina Grimes
- Other names: Andrea Grimes, Andrea Parker, Andrea G. Parker
- Education: Northeastern University, Georgia Tech
- Known for: Research in social computing, health equity, social justice, civic computing, public health
- Spouse: Lonnie Thomas Parker IV (married 2010)
- Scientific career
- Fields: Human computer interaction, computer supported cooperative work
- Workplaces: Northeastern University, Georgia Tech
- Thesis: A Cultural, Community Based Approached to Health Technology Design (2010)
- Doctoral advisor: Rebecca Grinter

Andrea Grimes Parker is an American computer scientist, researcher, and Associate Professor, known for her interdisciplinary study of human computer interaction (HCI) and personal health informatics. Parker is currently an associate professor at Georgia Institute of Technology (Georgia Tech) School of Interactive Computing. She also currently serves as an Adjunct Associate Professor in the Rollins School of Public Health at Emory University.

She was previously an Assistant Professor at Northeastern University, with joint appointments in the Khoury College of Computer Sciences and the Bouvé College of Health Sciences.

== Biography ==
=== Early life and education ===
She was born Andrea Elaina Grimes, to African American parents Octavia R. Grimes and Vincent E. Grimes. Her father works at the Santa Clara County public defender's office and her mother is a nurse case manager with Kaiser Permanente in San Jose.

In 2004, she was one of two United States representatives for the 2004 World Association for Cooperative Education Conference. Parker attended Northeastern University and received a B.S. degree in Computer Science in 2005. Parker was a member of Phi Kappa Phi National Honors Society and Upsilon Pi Epsilon while at Northeastern.

In 2010, she married Lonnie Thomas Parker IV, a classmate at Georgia Tech. She changed her name in 2010, and has research papers in both names. In 2011, she received a PhD from Georgia Tech. Parker's doctoral advisor was Rebecca E. Grinter and her thesis was titled, "A Cultural, Community Based Approached to Health Technology Design".

=== Research career ===
Parkers research lies generally in the fields of human-computer interaction (HCI) and computer-supported cooperative work (CSCW).

In 2010, OrderUP! was a game presented by Parker and colleagues at Ubicomp 2010 conference in Copenhagen, Denmark, created to teach people how to make smart choices when ordering food. The game was designed using Transtheoretical Model (TTM).

In 2013, Parker launched a social media platform to share workout tips, for people in the neighborhood of Roxbury that participate in a once a week gym program.

She has done research on the role of digital fitness trackers and social networks, and their impact on motivation, future planning, and behavior change. Parker is specifically interested in vulnerable and marginalized populations overcome barriers, and looking beyond the surface level interaction of data sharing found currently in many fitness trackers.

From 2014 until 2016, Parker served as the National Evaluator for the Aetna Foundation's portfolio of projects on mobile health interventions in community settings.

From 2018 until 2019, Parker was a Northeastern University Institute of Health Equity and Social Justice Research Faculty Scholar.

=== Teaching career ===
Parker is the founder and director of the Wellness Technology Research Lab at Georgia Tech. Parker is currently an Associate Professor at Georgia Institute of Technology (Georgia Tech) School of Interactive Computing. She also currently serves as an Adjunct Associate Professor in the Rollins School of Public Health at Emory University.

She was previously an assistant professor at Northeastern University, with joint appointments in the Khoury College of Computer Sciences and the Bouvé College of Health Sciences.

== Publications ==
=== Books ===
- Page-Reeves, Janet M., ed. (2019). "Technological Approaches to Food-Related Health Equity". Well-Being as a Multidimensional Concept: Understanding Connections among Culture, Community, and Health. Anthropology of Well-Being: Individual, Community, Society. John Andazola (contributor), Courtney Andrews (contributor), Melinda Davis (contributor), Jaelyn deMaría (contributor), Kristen Dillon (contributor), Alicia Edwards (contributor), Sarah Gopman (contributor), C. Estela Vasquez Guzman (contributor), Gale G. Hannigan (contributor), Rodney C. Haring (contributor), Emily Haozous (contributor), Anthony Ryan Hatch (contributor), Russell L. Holman (contributor), Elise Trott Jaramillo (contributor), Valarie Blue Bird Jernigan (contributor), Deja Knight (contributor), Paul Lindberg (contributor), Erik Lujan (contributor), Andrew Marcum (contributor), Jeff Maskovsky (contributor), Kara L. McKinney (contributor), Emily Mendenhall (contributor), Andrea Grimes Parker (contributor), David Rakel (contributor), Roberta Rael (contributor), Leigh Rauk (contributor), Thomas N. Scharmen (contributor), Jean Schensul (contributor), Nancy E. Schoenberg (contributor), Mary Alice Scott (contributor), Claire Snell-Rood (contributor), Andrew L. Sussman (contributor), Edison J. Trickett (contributor), Steven P. Verney (contributor), Lesley Jo Weaver (contributor), Cathleen E. Willging (contributor), Nicole Yonke (contributor). Washington DC: Lexington Books. ISBN 978-1498559386.
- Grimes, Andrea; Harper, Richard (2008). "Celebratory technology: new directions for food research in HCI". Proceedings of the SIGCHI conference on human factors in computing systems. New York City, NY: Association for Computing Machinery. pp. 467–476. doi:10.1145/1357054.1357130. ISBN 978-1-60558-011-1. S2CID 5934619.
- Grimes, Andrea; Kantroo, Vasudhara; Grinter, Rebecca E. (2010). "Let's play! Mobile health games for adults". Proceedings of the 12th ACM international conference on Ubiquitous computing. New York City, NY: Association for Computing Machinery. pp. 241–250. doi:10.1145/1864349.1864370. ISBN 978-1-60558-843-8. S2CID 7982924.

=== Articles ===
- Grimes Parker, Andrea (2014). "Reflection-through-performance: personal implications of documenting health behaviors for the collective". Personal and Ubiquitous Computing. 18 (7): 1737–1752. doi:10.1007/s00779-014-0780-5. S2CID 1619552.
- Grimes, Andrea; Grinter, Rebecca E. (2007). "Designing persuasion: Health technology for low-income African American communities". International Conference on Persuasive Technology. Lecture Notes in Computer Science. Vol. 4744. pp. 24–35. doi:10.1007/978-3-540-77006-0_4. ISBN 978-3-540-77005-3.
