= Joshua Yuan (engineer) =

Chinese-American scientist and engineer

Academic background
- Education: Fudan University; University of Arizona; University of Tennessee

Joshua Yuan is a scientist and engineer in sustainable technology development. He is the chair and the Lucy & Stanley Lopata Professor in the Department of Energy, Environmental, and Chemical Engineering in the McKelvey School of Engineering at Washington University in St. Louis. He is also the Director and Principal Investigator for Carbon Utilization Redesign for Biomanufacturing National Science Foundation Engineering Research Center. Previously, he was a faculty member at Texas A&M University since 2008, served as the director for the Synthetic and Systems Biology Innovation Hub since 2015, and was appointed as the chair for Synthetic Biology and Renewable Products in 2018. Yuan became a fellow of Royal Society of Chemistry in 2022. He became an American Association for the Advancement of Science (AAAS) fellow in 2026 and is currently serving on the Council of American Association for the Advancement of Science.

== Career ==
Yuan became an assistant professor at Texas A&M University in 2008. In this role, he began to develop new technologies for sustainability, renewable fuels and materials. In 2012, he led a team of scientists and engineers to develop new routes and synthetic organelles for diverting photosynthesis carbon to squalene, a terpene product. The technologies were later licensed and commercialized by SynShark LLC. He later continued to engineer cyanobacteria, known as blue algae, to produce another terpene, limonene. The work eventually led to developing a type of algae that can auto-sediment, allowing the low-cost harvest. He combined this harvesting technology with artificial intelligence to set a new world record for producing algae as a reliable, economic source for biofuel and bioproduct. The work also empowers algae to be better used for carbon capture and utilization.

To overcome the inherent limits of photosynthesis, he co-developed with Dr. Susie Dai a technology to integrate electrocatalysis and microorganism conversion to produce bioplastics from carbon dioxide, at a much higher efficiency than natural photosynthesis routes.. Their team recently have expanded to new concept of electrobiofuel and laid down the foundation for landing CURB NSF Engineering Research Center. The five year $26 million National Science Foundation grant is largest in McKelvey Engineering history.

Furthermore, his laboratory pursued a decade-long effort to define the structure-function relationship of lignin chemistry and its processing and products. In 2013, his laboratory then began using the microorganisms in the Rhodococcus genus in order to turn lignin into lipids, or fats, which can be used to produce biodiesel. Yuan later focused on converting lignin to plastics while also developing procedures to fractionate lignin for bioconversion. The work eventually led to the development of new biorefinery procedures to use both carbohydrate and lignin efficiently, and lower the bioplastics cost from lignin. Yuan's team also revealed that lignin chemical features such as molecular weight, uniformity, linkage, and functional groups could all impact lignin carbon fiber properties. The discoveries eventually guide the design of a new type of lignin to substantially improve carbon fiber properties. Yuan was recognized with a 2017 Innovation Award from Texas A&M Technology Commercialization.

In 2022, Yuan left Texas A&M to become chair of the Department of Energy, Environmental & Chemical Engineering in the McKelvey School of Engineering at Washington University in St. Louis. In 2024, Yuan has led researchers from eight institutes to land and launched the Carbon Utilization Redesign for Biomanufacturing (CURB) NSF Engineering Research Center. During Yuan's tenure, the department has recruited multiple faculty members and has seen rapid growth in research activity.
