= Game Developer (magazine) =

American magazine marketed to video game designers

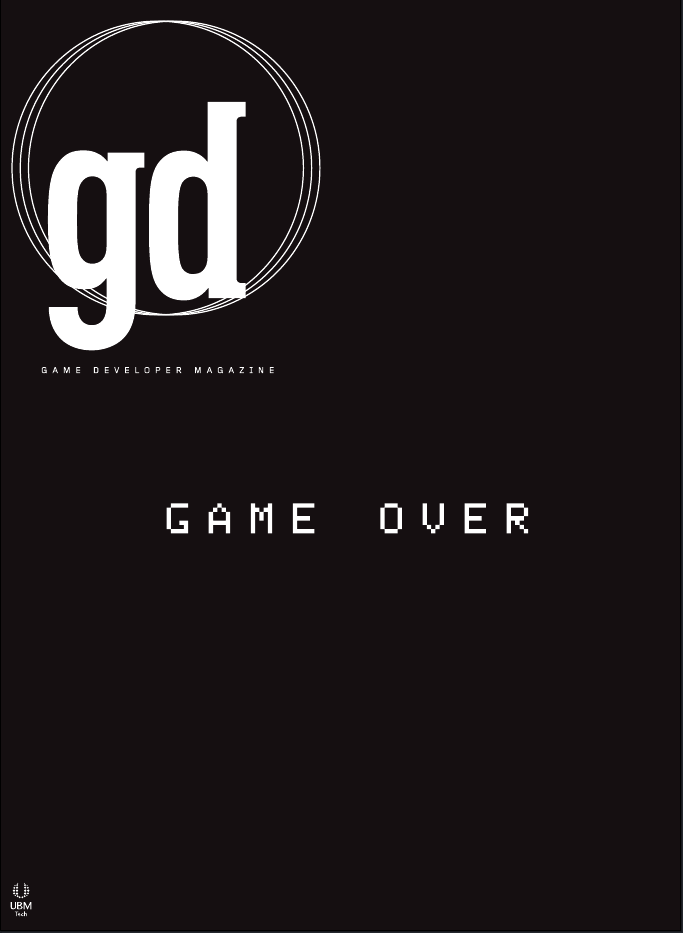
- June–July 2013 cover
- Editor: Patrick Miller
- Categories: Video game industry
- Frequency: Monthly
- First issue: March 1994; 32 years ago
- Final issue Number: June/July 2013; Vol 20 No 06
- Company: UBM Tech
- Country: USA
- Based in: San Francisco
- Language: English
- Website: gdmag.com
- ISSN: 1073-922X

Game Developer was a magazine for video game creators, originally started in March 1994 by Miller Freeman, Inc as quarterly, later bimonthly, and finally monthly. In each issue, industry leaders and experts shared technical solutions, reviewed new game development tools, and discussed strategies for creating innovative, successful video games. Monthly postmortems dissected the industry's leading games, from AAA console to social and mobile games and beyond, and columns gave insight into deeper development practices from across all disciplines, from design, to programming, to art, to business, and audio. It was closed in 2013 as part of a restructuring at parent company UBM Tech (part of UBM plc) that included the closing of all print publications owned by that company.

== Contents ==
The magazine contained articles on professional game development topics relating to game programming, art, audio, quality control, design, and production. Monthly columns from industry veterans offered in depth discussion on a variety of topics. It had articles by notable video game industry figures and reviews on game development related books, tools, and software packages. The back page "Soapbox" was also a popular feature but moved to sister site to Gamasutra circa 2004. It was replaced by a splash art page called "Thousand Words" and then replaced again with a regular column "Arrested Development".

Game Developer's most popular feature was probably its monthly "Postmortem" column which discusses the recent development of a video game with the top five each of "What Went Right" and "What Went Wrong". It provided a frank, first-hand account of the lessons learned in the development process. The first Postmortem was featured in October 1997 and written by Andre Vrignaud on Dark Sun Online.

Starting in 1998, Game Developer recognized exceptional game development tools with their "Front Line Awards" which were given annually. Winners included software (such as Photoshop and VTune), game engines (Unreal Engine), middleware (Havok physics), hardware (GeForce 3), and books (Computer Graphics: Principles and Practice).

Gamasutra, the sister publication web site of Game Developer, acts as an online resource for game developers, as well as a job posting board for employment in the game development field. It was not part of the closure that resulted in Game Developer's cessation and continued some features from the magazine. Gamasutra rebranded itself to Game Developer on August 26, 2021.

== See also ==
- Video game publisher
- Game programmer
- Game designer
- Game producer
