= Aaron Bobick =

American computer scientist

Aaron F. Bobick
- Education: MIT
- Awards: ACM Distinguished Member
- Scientific career
- Fields: Artificial intelligence
- Workplaces: Washington University in St. Louis, MIT, Georgia Tech, GVU Center
- Doctoral advisor: Whitman Richards

Aaron F Bobick is dean of the McKelvey School of Engineering at Washington University in St. Louis. Bobick’s research is in the field of artificial intelligence and computer vision. He has chaired and published papers in top-tier academic conferences in these areas. His research and expert opinions on technology have also been reported in major news sources.

== Education ==
Bobick has received his undergraduate degrees in 1981 in Mathematics and Computer Science from the Massachusetts Institute of Technology. Following this, Bobick received his Ph.D. in 1987, in cognitive science, also from MIT.

== Career ==
Upon receiving his Ph.D. from the Massachusetts Institute of Technology, Bobick worked at the MIT Media Lab as an assistant and associate professor until he left to accept a position as an associate professor at the Georgia Institute of Technology in the College of Computing. After arriving at Georgia Tech, Bobick served as the director of the GVU Center, a center focussed initially on graphics, visualization and usability in computer science, and in 2007 became the first chair of the new School of Interactive Computing.

Among Bobick’s accomplishments is KidsRoom, an immersive entertainment and learning environment that was a featured exhibit in the Millennium Dome. His expertise in using computer vision techniques to recognize people has received international attention in the popular press, including the BBC News and ABC News.

== Research interests ==
Bobick's research lies generally in the fields of artificial intelligence and computer vision. However, his research has also included research in the area of ubiquitous computing with a particular focus on smart home environments and living laboratories.

== Awards and honors ==
- 2011: ACM Distinguished MemberACM Distinguished Member.
