= Andries van Dam =

Dutch-American computer scientist

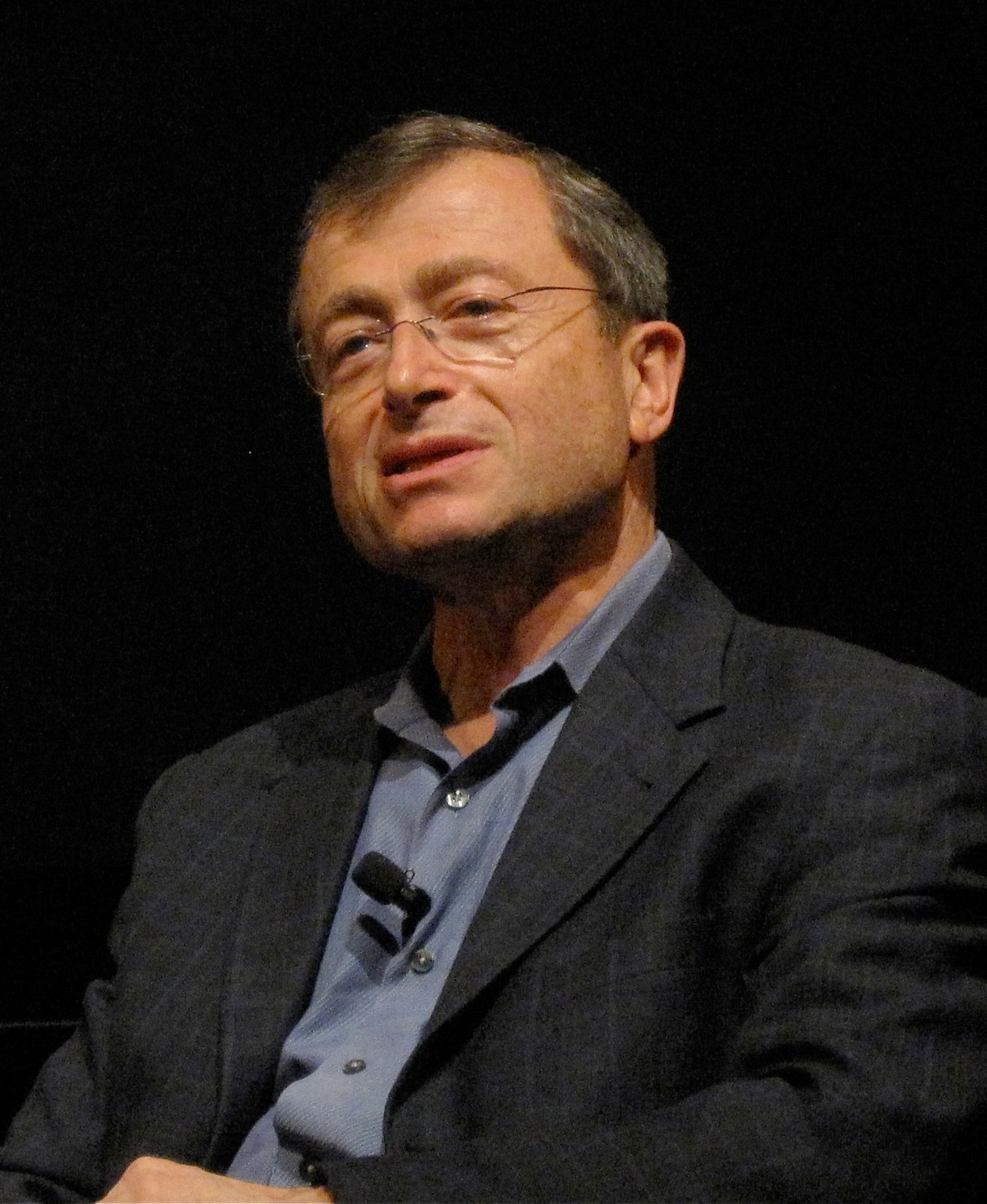
- Van Dam in 2008
- Born: December 8, 1938 (age 87); Groningen, the Netherlands
- Website: Andries van Dam at Brown University

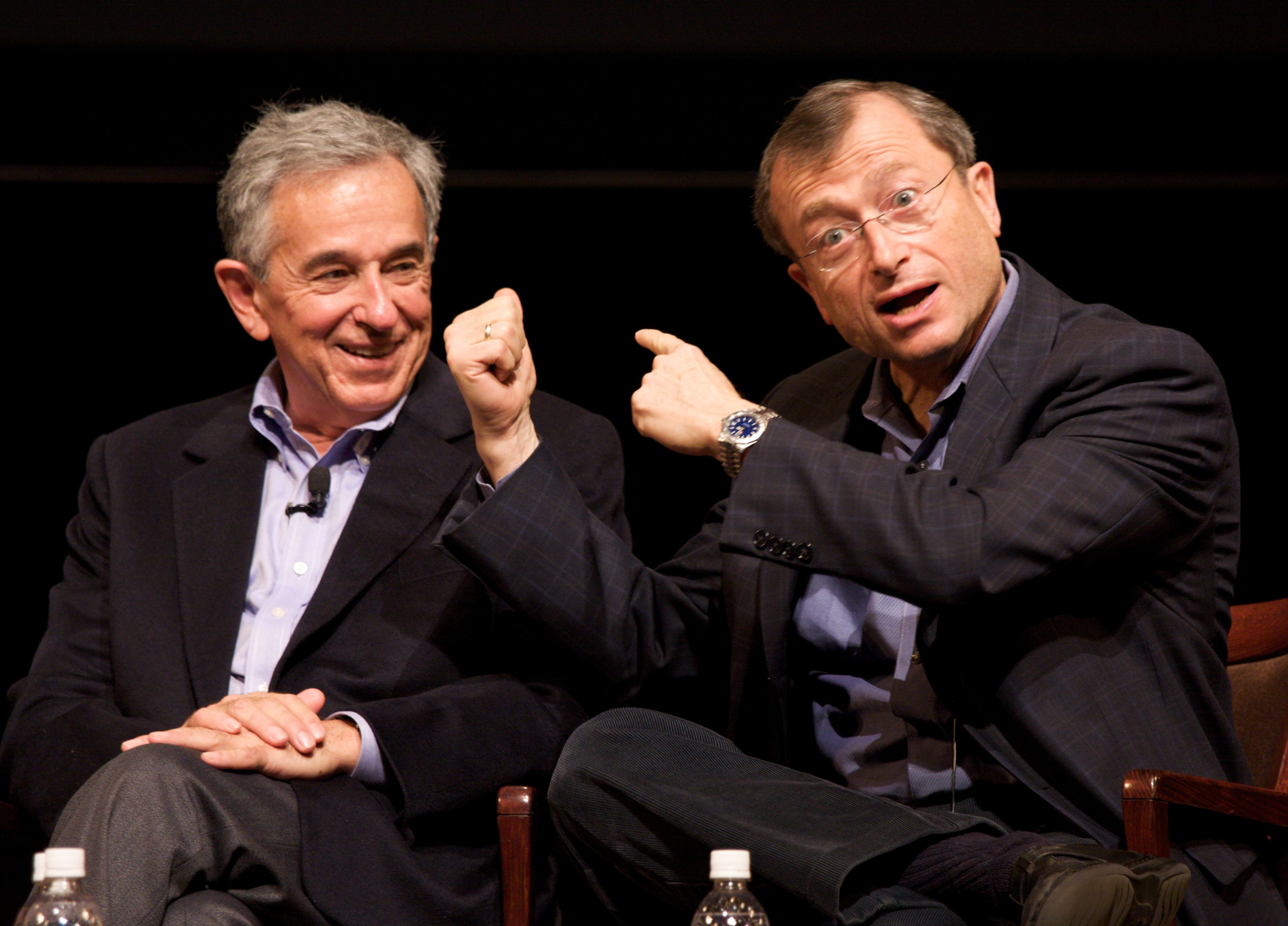
Jeff Rulifson and Van Dam in 2008

Andries "Andy" van Dam (born December 8, 1938) is a Dutch-American professor of computer science and former vice-president for research at Brown University in Providence, Rhode Island. Together with Ted Nelson he contributed to the first hypertext system, Hypertext Editing System (HES) in the late 1960s. He co-authored Computer Graphics: Principles and Practice along with J.D. Foley, S.K. Feiner, and John Hughes. He also co-founded the precursor of the ACM SIGGRAPH conference.

Van Dam serves on several technical boards and committees. He teaches an introductory course in computer science and courses in computer graphics at Brown University.

Van Dam received his B.S. degree with Honors in Engineering Sciences from Swarthmore College in 1960 and his M.S. and Ph.D. from the University of Pennsylvania in 1963 and 1966, respectively.

== Students ==
Van Dam has mentored undergraduates, other scholars, and practitioners in hypertext and computer graphics. One of his students was Randy Pausch, who gained national renown in the process of dying from pancreatic cancer. Pausch's Last Lecture in September 2007 was the basis for the bestseller Last Lecture. Van Dam was the final speaker after the hour-plus talk. He praised Pausch for his courage and leadership, calling him a role model. Pausch died on July 25, 2008. Danah boyd, Scott Draves, Dick Bulterman, Meredith Ringel Morris, Robert Sedgewick, Scott Snibbe, Andy Hertzfeld, Ed Lazowska, and Steven K. Feiner also were students of Andy van Dam.

== Achievements ==
Originally appointed as a professor of applied mathematics, van Dam helped to found the computer science program at Brown as a joint project between the departments of applied mathematics and engineering. When the program was promoted to a full department, van Dam served as its first chair, from 1979 to 1985. In 1995 van Dam was appointed Thomas J. Watson, Jr. University Professor of Technology and Education as well as professor of computer science.

At the University of Pennsylvania in 1966, he became one of the first people to receive a PhD in Computer Science.

Van Dam is perhaps most known as the co-designer, along with Ted Nelson, of the first hypertext system, HES, in the late 1960s. With it and its immediate successor, FRESS, he was an early proponent of the use of hypertext in the humanities and in pedagogy. The term hypertext was coined by Ted Nelson, who was working with him at the time. Van Dam's continued interest in hypertext was crucial to the development of modern markup and browsing technology, and several of his students were instrumental in the origin of XML, XSLT, and related Web standards.

He is also known for co-authoring Computer Graphics: Principles and Practice with J.D. Foley, S.K. Feiner, and J.F. Hughes. This popular textbook in computer graphics and is often called the "Bible" of computer graphics.

In 1967, van Dam co-founded ACM SICGRAPH, the precursor of today's ACM SIGGRAPH.

In 1983 he was one of the founders of IRIS, which developed a hypertext scholar's workstation. In 1984, he received the IEEE Centennial Medal.

Van Dam teaches an Introduction to Computer Graphics course, as well as one first-year course every fall. He is also serving on the technical board of Microsoft Research, as chairman of the Rhode Island Governor's Science and Technology Advisory Council (STAC), and as chairman of the IEEE James H. Mulligan, Jr. Education Medal committee. In 1994 he was inducted as a Fellow of the Association for Computing Machinery, and a chaired professorship was recently endowed in his honor at Brown University. In 2019, he was awarded the inaugural ACM SIGGRAPH Distinguished Educator Award.

When the Brown Center for Information Technology was built, van Dam demanded it include showers and a Chinese restaurant. The showers were built.

In Toy Story, Computer Graphics: Principles and Practice appears on Andy's bookshelf in the film as a tribute to van Dam.

== Documentary film ==
- Andries van Dam: Hypertext: An Educational Experiment in English and Computer Science at Brown University. Brown University, Providence, RI, U.S. 1974, Run time 15:16, Hypertext at IMDb, Full Movie on the Internet Archive
