= Computer Graphics: Principles and Practice =

Textbook

Computer Graphics: Principles and Practice 2nd Edition in C
- Author: James D. Foley, Andries van Dam, Steven K. Feiner, John Hughes
- Language: English
- Series: The Systems Programming Series
- Genre: Non-fiction
- Publisher: Addison-Wesley
- Publication date: 1995
- Publication place: United States
- Media type: Print (hardcover)
- Pages: 1175
- ISBN: 978-0-201-84840-3
- Preceded by: An Introduction to Database Systems, Volume II
- Followed by: Structured Programming: Theory and Practice

Computer Graphics: Principles and Practice is a textbook written by James D. Foley, Andries van Dam, Steven K. Feiner, John Hughes, Morgan McGuire, David F. Sklar, and Kurt Akeley and published by Addison–Wesley. First published in 1982 as Fundamentals of Interactive Computer Graphics, it is widely considered a classic standard reference book on the topic of computer graphics. It is sometimes known as the bible of computer graphics (due to its size).

== Editions ==
=== First Edition ===
The first edition, published in 1982 and titled Fundamentals of Interactive Computer Graphics, discussed the SGP library, which was based on ACM's SIGGRAPH CORE 1979 graphics standard, and focused on 2D vector graphics.

=== Second Edition ===
The second edition, published 1990, was completely rewritten and covered 2D and 3D raster and vector graphics, user interfaces, geometric modeling, anti-aliasing, advanced rendering algorithms and an introduction to animation. The SGP library was replaced by SRGP (Simple Raster Graphics Package), a library for 2D raster primitives and interaction handling, and SPHIGS (Simple PHIGS), a library for 3D primitives, which were specifically written for the book.

=== Second Edition in C ===
In the second edition in C, published in 1995, all examples were converted from Pascal to C. New implementations for the SRGP and SPHIGS graphics packages in C were also provided.

=== Third Edition ===
A third edition covering modern GPU architecture was released in July 2013. Examples in the third edition are written in C++, C#, WPF, GLSL, OpenGL, G3D, or pseudocode.

== Awards ==
The book has won a Front Line Award (Hall of Fame) in 1998.
