= Blair MacIntyre =

American augmented reality researcher

- Education: PhD, Columbia University, 1998
- Occupations: Researcher, Director
- Employer: Georgia Institute of Technology
- Known for: Augmented reality research
- Website: blairmacintyre.com

Blair MacIntyre is a Professor and Director of the Augmented Environments Lab at Georgia Institute of Technology working in the field of augmented reality.

== Career ==
After completing his doctorate at Columbia University in 1998, MacIntyre moved to the Georgia Institute of Technology where he founded and was appointed director of the newly-formed Augmented Environments Lab. In 2010 MacIntyre was named as the director of the Qualcomm Augmented Reality Game Studio. Currently, MacIntyre works as a Principal Research Scientist in Mozilla's Emerging Technologies team.

As the director of the KHARMA project, MacIntyre developed the Argon augmented reality browser, which was released for the iPhone in 2011.

== Selected publications ==
- Feiner, S., MacIntyre, B., and Seligmann, D. "Knowledge-based augmented reality". Communications of the ACM, 36(7), July 1993, 52-62.
