= Computational journalism =

Application of computation to the activities of journalism

Computational journalism can be defined as the application of computation to the activities of journalism such as information gathering, organization, sensemaking, communication and dissemination of news information, while upholding values of journalism such as accuracy and verifiability. The field draws on technical aspects of computer science including artificial intelligence, content analysis (NLP, NLG, vision, audition), visualization, personalization and recommender systems as well as aspects of social computing and information science.

== History of the field ==
The field emerged at Georgia Institute of Technology in 2006 where a course in the subject was taught by professor Irfan Essa. In February 2008 Georgia Tech hosted a Symposium on Computation and Journalism which convened several hundred computing researchers and journalists in Atlanta, GA. In July 2009, The Center for Advanced Study in the Behavioral Sciences (CASBS) at Stanford University hosted a workshop to push the field forward.

Since 2012, Columbia Journalism School has offered a course called Frontiers of Computational Journalism for the students enrolled in their dual degree in CS and journalism. The course covers many computer science topics from the perspective of journalism, including document vector space representation, algorithmic and social story selection (recommendation algorithms), language topic models, information visualization, knowledge representation and reasoning, social network analysis, quantitative and qualitative inference, and information security.

Syracuse University launched a masters in computational journalism in 2015, which closed in 2026.

Stanford University launched a Computational Journalism Lab in 2014, which closed in 2022. Also they created a course titled, Computational Journalism.

In 2017, the Associated Press published a guide for newsrooms to deploy artificial intelligence and computational methods.

== Applications ==
Over the years, computational journalism applications have involved different areas of the newsmaking process: from data gathering to the analysis of big data and their representation. In the beginning, therefore, it was more an aspect area linked to the discipline of data science, where the research and exploration of a fact may be automated.

With advances in artificial intelligence, computational journalism has expanded beyond earlier forms of automated data, driven reporting to include more complex applications, such as automated text generation and the production of news articles.

Examples of applications include the use of artificial intelligence systems by The Washington Post as early as 2017. The Guardian in 2019 also developed ReportMate, an experimental automated reporting system designed to assist with the generation of news content.

== Software ==
=== Text based ===
- Comparison of text editors
- Comparison of TeX editors
- Comparison of word processors
- List of chatbots

=== Visualizations ===
- List of 2D graphics software
- List of information graphics software
- Comparison of geographic information systems software
- List of statistical software
- List of video editing software
- Web infographics — D3.js, Plotly, JFreeChart, Infogram, Graphviz, Gephi, Mapbox, or Canvas.

== Related fields ==
- Database journalism
- Computer-assisted reporting
- Data-driven journalism (extending the focus of data investigation to a workflow from data analysis to data visualization to storytelling based on the findings)

== Resources ==
- Chapter on Computational Journalism in Handbook of Journalism Studies 2nd Ed.
- Columbia University Computational Journalism course
- Computational+Journalism courses at Georgia Tech
- A computational journalism reading list by Jonathan Stray of the Associated Press
- Communications of the ACM, October 2011, "Computational Journalism"
- How Artificial Intelligence Will Impact Journalism by Francesco Marconi of the Associated Press
