= Hypertext Editing System =

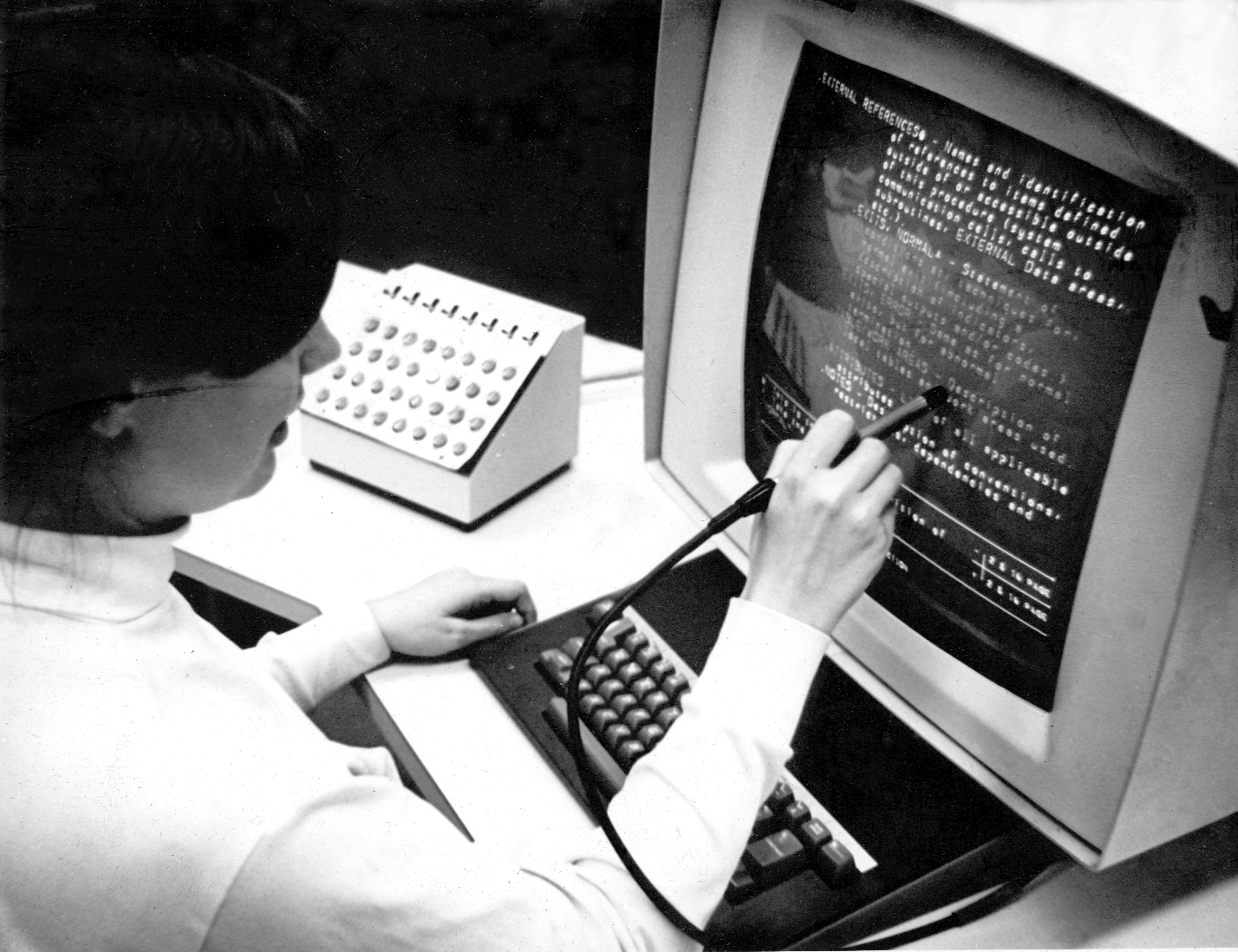
Hypertext Editing System (HES) IBM 2250 display console, with lightpen – Chris Braun, Brown University, 1969

The Hypertext Editing System, or HES, was an early hypertext research project conducted at Brown University in 1967 by Andries van Dam, Ted Nelson, and several Brown students. It was the first hypertext system available on commercial equipment that novices could use.

HES organized data into two main types: links and branching text. The branching text could automatically be arranged into menus, and a point within a given area could also have an assigned name, called a label, and be accessed later by that name from the screen. Although HES pioneered many modern hypertext concepts, its emphasis was on text formatting and printing.

HES required an IBM 2250 display console and a large memory partition on Brown's IBM System/360 Model 50 campus mainframe computer which limited its use: "Although it was shared with others, it was a multi-million-dollar piece of technology housed in a large machine room that van Dam’s team was able to use as essentially a personal computer between midnight and 4 AM." The program was used by NASA's Houston Manned Spacecraft Center for documentation on the Apollo space program. The project's research was funded by IBM but the program was stopped around 1969, and replaced by the FRESS (File Retrieval and Editing System) project.

Ted Nelson claims credit for inventing the “back” button (“undo”) with regard to hypertext, as the Hypertext Editing System was the first system that contained one.

The HES editor was followed by another editing system called the File Retrieval and Editing System (FRESS).
