= Commission on Enhancing National Cybersecurity =

The President's Commission on Enhancing National Cybersecurity is a Presidential Commission formed on April 13, 2016, to develop a plan for protecting cyberspace, and America's economic reliance on it. The commission released its final report in December 2016. The report made recommendations regarding the intertwining roles of the military, government administration and the private sector in providing cyber security. Chairman Donilon said of the report that its coverage "is unusual in the breadth of issues" with which it deals.

== Recommendations ==
The report made sixteen major recommendations with fifty-three specific action items broadly grouped under six areas:

1. Protecting the information and digital infrastructure
2. Investing in the secure growth of information and digital infrastructure
3. Consumer information access
4. Building the cybersecurity workforce
5. Building a secure governmental cybersecurity framework
6. Keeping interconnectivity open, fair, competitive, and secure

The Commission found that strong authentication systems were mandatory for adequate cybersecurity, not just for the government, but for all commercial systems, and private individuals. The commission also stressed remote identity proofing and security for the Internet of things (IoT). Finding that technicians who know cybersecurity and can protect systems are few and in short supply, the commission recommended nationally supported training programs to produce an adequate workforce, as well as increasing the level of expertise in the existing workforce. The Commission highlighted the importance of partnerships between government and the private sector as a powerful tool for encouraging the technology, policies and practices we need to secure and grow the digital economy. (page 2)

Some criticised the commission's work as lacking an understanding of cybersecurity and not being cognizant of "cyber reality" and the cost of some of the action items, but others found the report constructive and meaningful.

== Commission members ==
The initial members of the Commission are:

- Tom Donilon, former Assistant to the President and National Security Advisor (Chair)
- Sam Palmisano, former CEO of IBM (Vice Chair)
- General Keith Alexander, CEO of IronNet Cybersecurity, former Director of the National Security Agency and former Commander of U.S. Cyber Command
- Annie Antón, Professor and Chair of the School of Interactive Computing at Georgia Tech.
- Ajay Banga, President and CEO of MasterCard
- Steven Chabinsky, General Counsel and Chief Risk Officer of CrowdStrike
- Patrick Gallagher, Chancellor of the University of Pittsburgh and former Director of the National Institute of Standards and Technology
- Peter Lee, Corporate Vice President, Microsoft Research
- Herbert Lin, Senior Research Scholar for Cyber Policy and Security at the Stanford Center for International Security and Cooperation and Research Fellow at the Hoover Institution
- Heather Murren, former member of the Financial Crisis Inquiry Commission and co-founder of the Nevada Cancer Institute
- Joe Sullivan, Chief Security Officer of Uber and former Chief Security Officer of Facebook
- Maggie Wilderotter, Executive Chairman of Frontier Communications

== Follow-on ==
Incoming President Trump has indicated that he wants a full review of U.S. cyber protection policy.
