= Steven K. Feiner =

American computer scientist

- Education: Brown University
- Known for: Computer graphics, Augmented reality, Spatial computing
- Awards: CHI Academy 2011, IEEE VGTC 2014 Virtual Reality Career Award
- Scientific career
- Fields: Computer graphics, Human-computer interaction
- Workplaces: Columbia University
- Doctoral advisor: Andy van Dam
- Doctoral students: Lauren Wilcox
- Website: Steven K. Feiner at Columbia University

Steven K. Feiner is an American computer scientist, serving as Professor for computer science at Columbia University in the field of computer graphics. He is well-known for his research in augmented reality (AR), and co-author of Computer Graphics: Principles and Practice. He directs the Columbia University Computer Graphics and User Interface Lab.

== Biography ==
Feiner earned a bachelor's degree from Brown University in 1973, and received his Ph.D. from Brown in 1985.

== Recognition ==
Feiner was elected as an ACM Fellow in 2018 for "contributions to human-computer interaction, virtual and augmented reality, and 3D user interfaces".
