= Georgia Institute of Technology School of Interactive Computing =

- Type: Public
- Established: 2007
- Chair: Ayanna Howard
- Faculty: 68
- Postgraduates: 297
- Location: Atlanta, Georgia, United States; 33.77730°N 84.39003°W

The School of Interactive Computing is an academic unit located within the College of Computing at the Georgia Institute of Technology (Georgia Tech). It conducts both research and teaching activities related to interactive computing at the undergraduate and graduate levels. These activities focus on computing's interaction with users and the environment, as well as how computers impact the quality of people's lives.

== History ==
The School of Interactive Computing was formed in February 2007, when the former Interactive & Intelligent Computing Division was renamed and promoted to "School" status. Aaron Bobick was appointed as the school's first chair. Along with its sibling academic unit, the School of Computer Science, the School of Interactive Computing represents the first time a college-level computing program has delineated the field into separate but related bodies of study. In July 2012, Annie Antón, formerly at North Carolina State University, replaced Bobick as school chair.

== Degrees offered ==
The School of Interactive Computing offers bachelor's degrees, master's degrees, and doctoral degrees in several fields. These degrees are technically granted by the School's parent organization, the Georgia Tech College of Computing, and often awarded in conjunction with other academic units within Georgia Tech.

=== Doctoral degrees ===
- Doctor of Philosophy (Ph.D.) in Computer Science
- Doctor of Philosophy (Ph.D.) in Machine Learning
- Doctor of Philosophy (Ph.D.) in Human-Centered Computing
- Doctor of Philosophy (Ph.D.) in Robotics

=== Master's degrees ===
- Master of Science (M.S.) in Computer Science
- Master of Science (M.S.) in Human-Computer Interaction (HCI)

=== Bachelor's degrees ===
- Bachelor of Science (B.S.) in Computational Media
- Bachelor of Science (B.S.) in Computer Science

== Research ==
The faculty and students of the School conduct a variety of research in areas including cognitive science, computer vision, human-computer interaction, learning sciences, machine learning, natural language processing, and robotics. A common theme across research is an emphasis on interactive computing, which is an increasingly recognized term for describing a class of research problems that sit at the intersection of computing and the human environment.

== Notable faculty ==
- Gregory Abowd
- Annie Antón
- Ronald C. Arkin
- Aaron Bobick
- Amy S. Bruckman
- Henrik I. Christensen
- Frank Dellaert
- W. Keith Edwards
- Irfan Essa
- James D. Foley
- Ashok Goel
- Rebecca Grinter
- Mark Guzdial
- Janet L. Kolodner
- Elizabeth Mynatt
- Andrea Grimes Parker
- Ashwin Ram
- Thad Starner
- John Stasko
- Greg Turk
- Diyi Yang

== Location ==
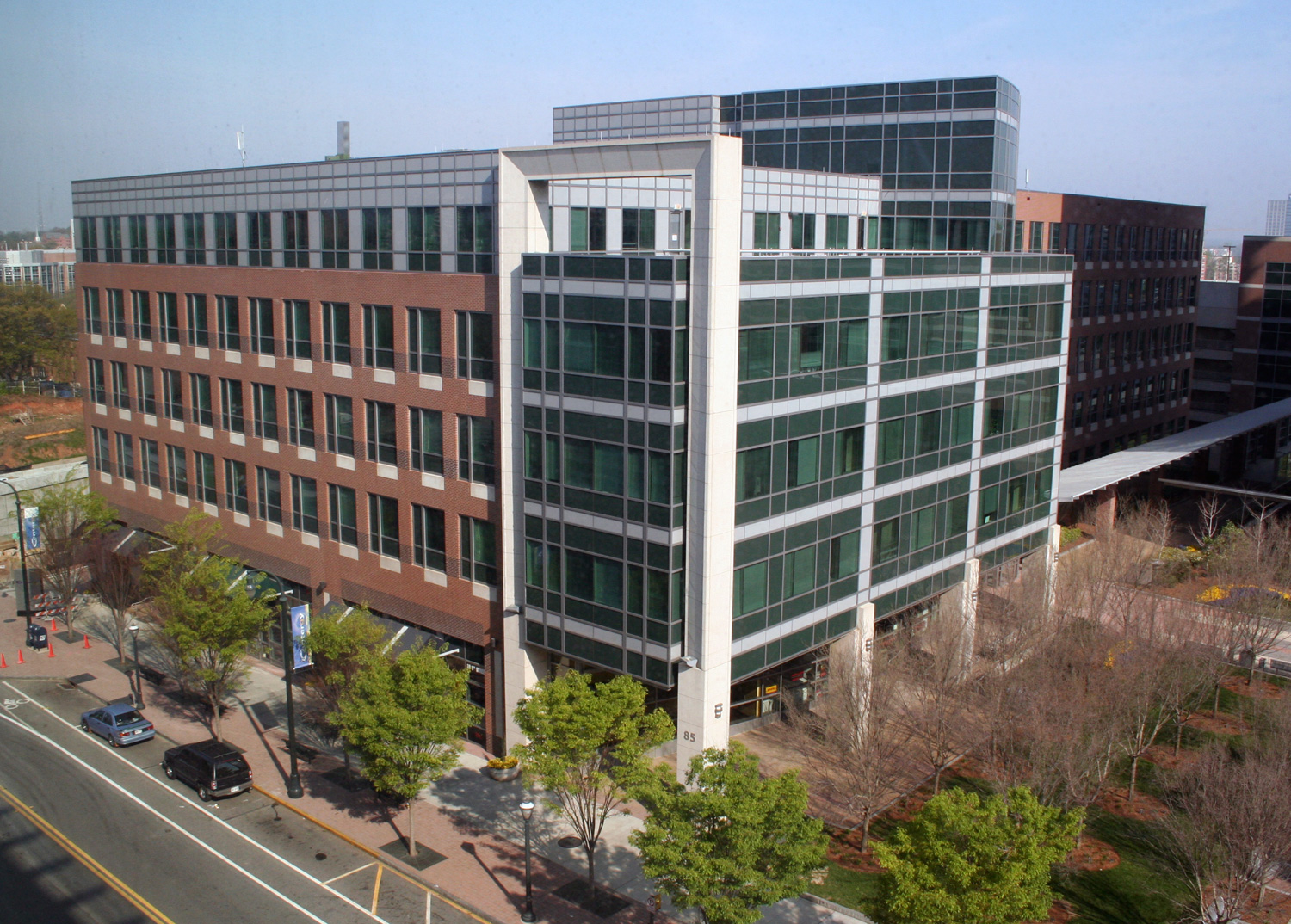
Tech Square Research Building

The School of Interactive Computing's administrative offices, as well as those of most of its faculty and graduate students, are located in the Technology Square Research Building (TSRB) at Technology Square in Midtown Atlanta, Georgia, just east of the Institute's main campus. TSRB also houses the GVU Center and RIM@GT, two interdisciplinary research centers with which many School of Interactive Computing personnel are affiliated.

== See also ==
- Georgia Institute of Technology College of Computing
- GVU Center
- RIM@GT
