= International Journal of Pattern Recognition and Artificial Intelligence =

Artificial intelligence journal

- Discipline: Artificial intelligence
- Language: English
- Edited by: X. Jiang, P.S.P. Wang

Publication details
- History: 1987–present
- Publisher: World Scientific (Singapore)
- Impact factor: 1.375 (2019)

Standard abbreviations
- ISO 4: Int. J. Pattern Recognit. Artif. Intell.

Indexing
- ISSN: 0218-0014 (print); 1793-6381 (web)

Links
- Journal homepage

The International Journal of Pattern Recognition and Artificial Intelligence was founded in 1987 and is published by World Scientific. The journal covers developments in artificial intelligence, and its sub-field, pattern recognition. This includes articles on image and language processing, robotics and neural networks.

== Abstracting and indexing ==
The journal is abstracted and indexed in:

- SciSearch
- ISI Alerting Services
- CompuMath Citation Index
- Current Contents/Engineering, Computing & Technology
- Inspec
- io-port.net
- Compendex
- Computer Abstracts
