= Blaine Price =

Canadian professor (born 1964)

Blaine A. Price
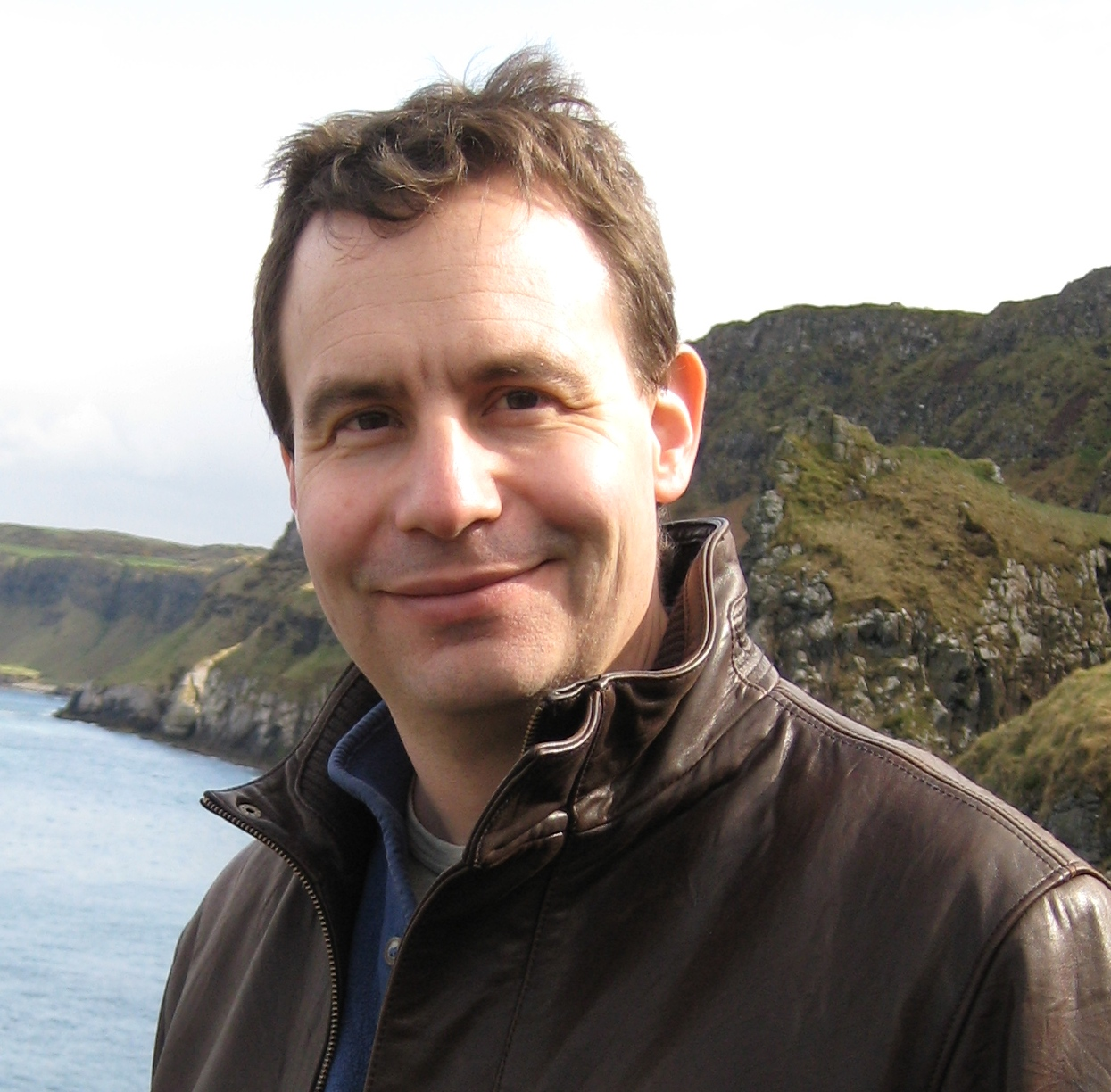
- Born: 1964 (age 61–62); Montreal, Quebec, Canada
- Citizenship: Dual Canadian/British
- Education: Queen's University; University of Toronto
- Known for: Ubiquitous/Wearable Computing/Lifelogging applied to Health/Wellbeing (former research areas: Software Visualization e-learning/Internet teaching)
- Scientific career
- Fields: Computer Science
- Workplaces: The Open University
- Doctoral advisor: Ronald Baecker

Blaine Alexander Price (born 1964) is a professor of Computing at The Open University in the United Kingdom.

Price was born in Montreal, Quebec, Canada. He obtained his BSc in computing and information science from Queen's University in 1988 and his MSc in computer science from the University of Toronto in 1991.

== Career ==
In 1989, Price was a summer research intern in Apple Computer's Human Interface Group. In 1990 he completed his MSc dissertation on automatic animation of concurrent programs and began his PhD research in software visualisation with Ronald Baecker. In 1991 he took a one-year assignment in Open University's Human Cognition Research Lab (now the Knowledge Media Institute) and three years later he was appointed to a temporary contract as a lecturer in computing in the faculty of mathematics. The next year he was made a permanent lecturer and launched a 4-year program to transform the delivery of Open University materials from paper and surface postal delivery to electronic delivery. He produced the first automatic system for large scale processing of student electronic assignment submission and return.

In 1997 he took a 2-year secondment as chief systems strategist to the Knowledge Media Institute. Upon returning to the renamed faculty of mathematics and computing, he resumed his academic role and conducted research in the use of robotics in teaching computing. In 2007 he launched the Open University's first course in forensic computing. The current version of this module is M812 Digital Forensics. In 2004 he began conducting research into privacy with a focus on mobile computing and lifelogging in particular. More recently he has concentrated on applications of wearables and IoT technologies on health and wellbeing. He continues to supervise students and conduct research in this area and is a principal investigator and co-investigator on a number of large projects funded by the UK and European Research Councils.

Blaine has always taken a human-centred approach to computing. He is interested in privacy in mobile and ubiquitous computing and in lifelogging technologies in particular, including both personal lifelogging and logging energy and resource usage. He has supervised PhD students in the areas of privacy, sustainable computing, digital forensics and more recently wearable and ubiquitous computing applied to healthcare. He was principal investigator on a number of Knowledge Transfer Partnership projects with industrial partners from 2009 to 2011, a co-investigator on the £1.2M EPSRC PRiMMA (Privacy Rights Management for Mobile Applications) from 2008 to 2011 and a co-investigator on the 5-year ERC funded ASAP (Adaptive Security and Privacy), where he is looking at security and privacy issues in lifelogging. He was also a co-investigator on the EPSRC funded Privacy Dynamics grant (2013–2017). He is Principal Investigator on the EPSRC funded Monetize Me grant (2014–2017) and Principal Investigator on the EPSRC funded STRETCH grant (2017–2020). He is also Chief Investigator on a number of studies at Milton Keynes University Hospital using wearable and ubiquitous computing to improve healthcare in areas ranging from Cardiology to recovery from orthopaedic surgery.

Blaine is an academic advisor for a number of BBC/Open University co-productions, an advisor to the Open Rights Group, a chartered digital forensic scientist and an accreditation assessor in digital forensics for the Chartered Society of Forensic Sciences.

He appeared on the BBC Today programme on 12 August 2013 in connection with the Monitor Me programme on the BBC2 Horizon the same day.

In 2014 he gave a TEDx Talk at the University of Nicosia entitled "Am I normal? Why self-quantification is for everyone".

Blaine Price announced his retirement for 29 June 2024 after 33 years service at the Open University.

== Selected publications ==
- Bennasar M, Banks D, Price BA, Kardos A. Minimal Patient Clinical Variables to Accurately Predict Stress Echocardiography Outcome: Validation Study Using Machine Learning Techniques. JMIR Cardio 2020;4(1):e16975. DOI: 10.2196/16975
- Blaine A. Price; Avelie Stuart; Gul Calikli; Ciaran McCormick; Vikram Mehta; Luke Hutton; Arosha K. Bandara; Mark Levine and Bashar Nuseibeh. 2017. Logging you, Logging me: A Replicable Study of Privacy and Sharing Behaviour in Groups of Visual Lifeloggers. Proc. ACM Interact. Mob. Wearable Ubiquitous Technol. 9, 4, Article 39 (June 2017), 18 pages.
- Blaine A. Price; Karim Adam and Bashar Nuseibeh (2005). Keeping ubiquitous computing to yourself: a practical model for user control of privacy. International Journal of Human-Computer Studies, 63(1–2), pp. 228–253.
- Mancini, Clara; Rogers, Yvonne; Bandara, Arosha; Coe, Tony; Jedrzejczyk, Lukasz; Joinson, Adam; Price, Blaine A.; Thomas, Keerthi and Nuseibeh, Bashar (2010). Contravision: Exploring users' reactions to futuristic technology. In: Proceedings of the 28th International Conference on Human factors in computing systems (CHI2010), 10–15 April 2010, Atlanta Georgia, USA.
- Blaine A. Price; Ron M. Baecker and Ian S. Small (1992). A Taxonomy of Software Visualization. Journal of Visual Languages and Computing, Vol. 4, pp. 211–266.
- For a full list of publications see google scholar

== Personal ==
Price lives in Milton Keynes, England, with his wife, Linda Price (professor of technology enhanced learning) and two children. He is the nephew of the Canadian geologist Professor Raymond A. Price.
