= Information Visualization (journal) =

- Discipline: Information science
- Language: English
- Edited by: Chaomei Chen

Publication details
- History: 2002-present
- Publisher: SAGE Publications
- Frequency: Quarterly
- Impact factor: (2010)

Standard abbreviations
- ISO 4: Inf. Vis.

Indexing
- ISSN: 1473-8716
- LCCN: 2004238309
- OCLC no.: 174835795

Links
- Journal homepage; Online access; Online archive

Information Visualization is a quarterly peer-reviewed academic journal that publishes covers the field of information science, in particular regarding theories, methodologies, techniques and evaluations of information visualization and its applications. The editor-in-chief is Chaomei Chen (Drexel University). It was established in 1998 by Palgrave Publishing, and is currently published by SAGE Publications.

== Abstracting and indexing ==
Information Visualization is abstracted and indexed in:

- Applied Science & Technology Index
- Computer Abstracts International Database
- FLUIDEX
- Library Information Science Abstracts
- Scopus
