= Georgia Institute of Technology Institute for Robotics and Intelligent Machines =

Coordinates: 33.777297°N 84.390031°W

- RIM@GT logo
- Type: Nonprofit
- Industry: Research and development Engineering; Science; Robotics
- Founded: 2006
- Founder: Henrik I. Christensen
- Headquarters: Atlanta, Georgia, United States
- Key people: Seth Hutchinson (Executive Director)
- Parent: Georgia Institute of Technology
- Website: robotics.gatech.edu

The Institute for Robotics and Intelligent Machines (IRIM@GT) is an interdisciplinary research unit at the Georgia Institute of Technology. The center was launched May, 2006, and consists of researchers from the School of Interactive Computing in the College of Computing, College of Engineering, and Georgia Tech Research Institute. IRIM@GT currently offers a Ph.D. program in robotics, the first truly multi-disciplinary program in the country after the one of Carnegie Mellon University.

== Mission ==
"IRIM@Georgia Tech serves as the flagship for Georgia Tech's robotics efforts, coordinating the university's capabilities in this field under one roof." - Henrik Christensen, former director, distinguished professor and KUKA Chair of Robotics

The center activities has 3 focal points:

- Engineering research on core technologies and methods at a level that is recognized as world leading.
- An integrated Ph.D. program for education of a new generation of researchers that will take up positions at the best institutions and in the most influential companies worldwide. They will be recognized as the leading systems integrators for intelligent robot systems.
- Transfer of technology to real world applications that illustrate the value of new generations of robot systems.

== History ==
IRIM@GT was launched May, 2006

== Organization ==
=== Institutes ===
- Institute for Personal Robots in Education

=== Laboratories ===
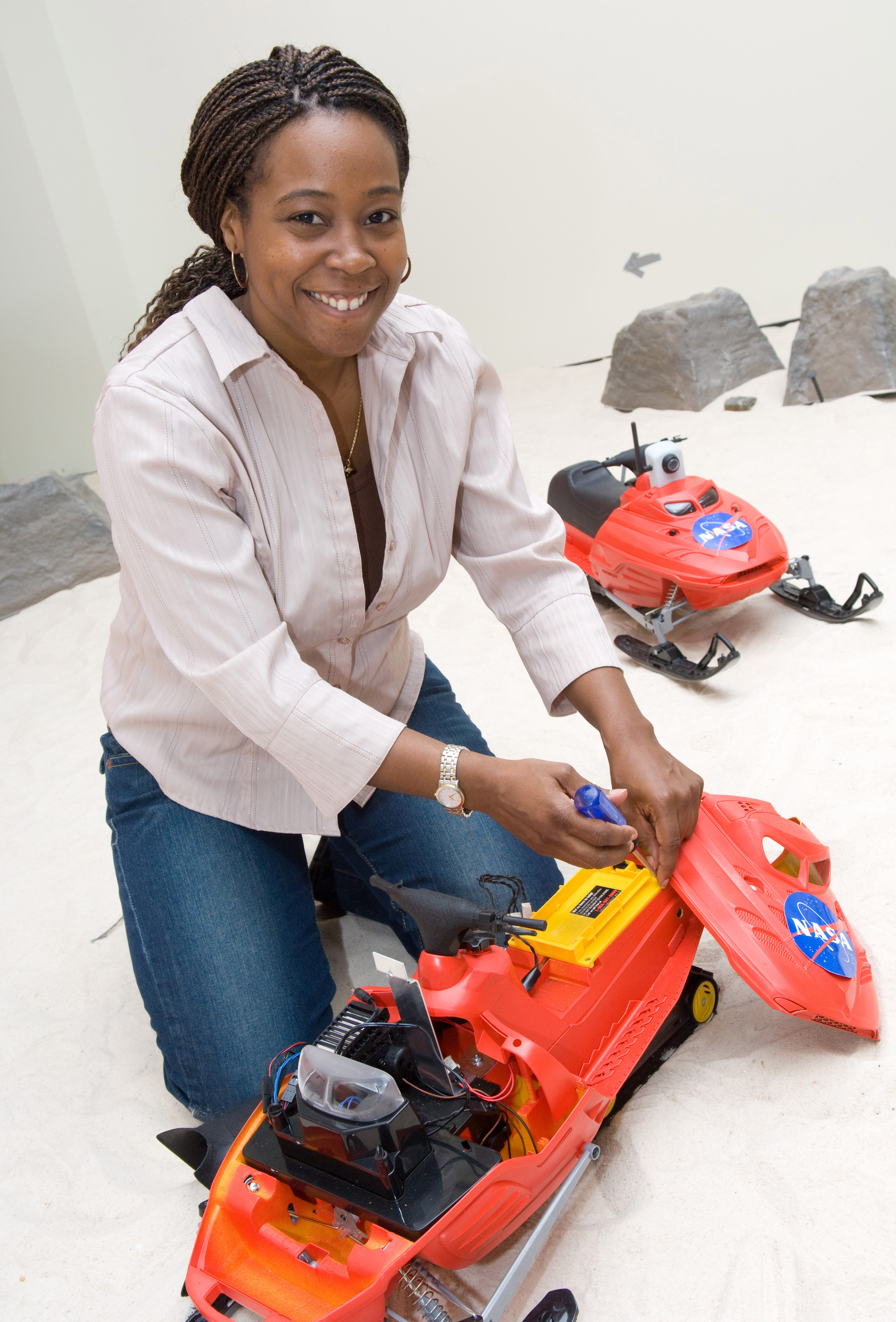
Ayanna M. Howard, Associate Professor in ECE, with a SnoMote robot designed to study the impact of global warming on Antarctic ice shelves.

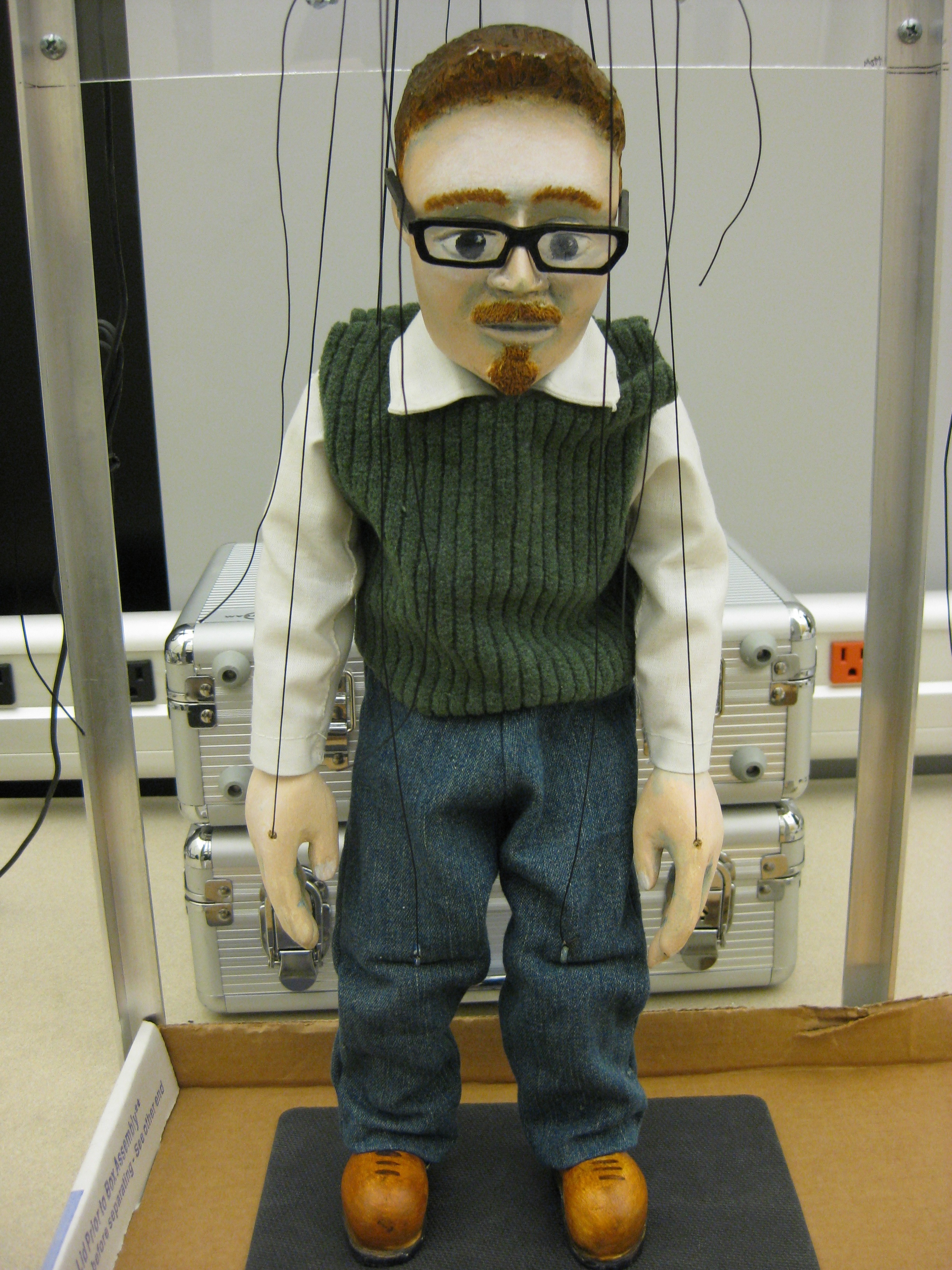
A robot-manipulated Marionette (PI: Magnus B. Egerstedt)

- Advanced Intelligent Mechatronics Research Laboratory, School of Mechanical Engineering.
- Agricultural Technology Research Program, Georgia Tech Research Institute.
- Biomedical Imaging Lab, Department of Biomedical Engineering.
- The BORG Lab, College of Computing.
- Computational Perception Lab, College of Computing.
- Contextual Computing Group, College of Computing.
- Construction Resource Center, College of Architecture.
- Embedded and Autonomous Systems Laboratory, School of Electrical and Computer Engineering.
- Georgia Robotics and Intelligent Systems Lab, School of Electrical and Computer Engineering.
- Human Automation Systems Laboratory, School of Electrical and Computer Engineering.
- Intelligent Machines Dynamics Laboratory, School of Mechanical Engineering.
- Laboratory for Neuroengineering, Department of Biomedical Engineering and Department of Electrical and Computer Engineering.
- The Mobile Robot Lab, College of Computing.
- Robotic Mechanisms Laboratory, School of Mechanical Engineering.
- The Unmanned Aerial Vehicle Research Facility (UAV Lab), School of Aerospace Engineering.
- Virtual Factory Laboratory, School of Industrial and Systems Engineering.
- Human Vision Simulation Laboratory, Georgia Tech Research Institute.
- Socially Intelligent Machines Laboratory, College of Computing
