= James D. Foley =

American computer scientist

James David Foley
- Born: July 20, 1942 (age 84); Pennsylvania, U.S.
- Education: University of Michigan, Lehigh University
- Known for: Computer graphics, Human-Computer Interaction
- Awards: IEEE Fellow, ACM Fellow, AAAS Fellow, NAE Member, ACM SIGGRAPH Steven A. Coons Award, ACM SIGCHI Lifetime Achievement Award
- Scientific career
- Fields: Computer graphics, Human-computer interaction
- Workplaces: Georgia Tech, GVU Center
- Doctoral advisor: Keki Irani

James David Foley (born July 20, 1942) is an American computer scientist and computer graphics researcher. He is a Professor Emeritus and held the Stephen Fleming Chair in Telecommunications in the School of Interactive Computing at Georgia Institute of Technology (Georgia Tech). He was Interim Dean of Georgia Tech's College of Computing from 2008–2010. He is perhaps best known as the co-author of several widely used textbooks in the field of computer graphics, of which over 400,000 copies are in print and translated in ten languages. Foley most recently conducted research in instructional technologies and distance education.

== Early life and education ==
Foley was born in Pennsylvania. He attended Lehigh University in Bethlehem, Pennsylvania, where he graduated with a bachelor's degree in electrical engineering in 1964. Foley was initiated into Phi Beta Kappa society and Tau Beta Pi while at Lehigh. He received his Ph.D. in computer, information, and control engineering from the University of Michigan in 1969.

== Career ==
After completing his graduate studies, Foley was first employed by the University of North Carolina. In 1977, he accepted a faculty position at George Washington University, where he became chairman of the Department of Electrical Engineering and Computer Science. Foley joined the Georgia Tech faculty in 1991.

Shortly after moving to Georgia Tech, Foley founded the GVU Center, which in 1996 was ranked first by U.S. News & World Report for graduate computer science work in graphics and user interaction. That same year, he was appointed director of the Mitsubishi Electric Research Laboratories (MERL) in Cambridge, Massachusetts. Foley also served as editor-in-chief of ACM Transactions on Graphics from 1991 to 1995.

In 1997, Foley was recognized by ACM SIGGRAPH with the prestigious Steven A. Coons Award. The receipt of this biannual award places Foley among the company of computer graphics pioneers such as Andy van Dam, Jim Blinn, Edwin Catmull and Ivan Sutherland.

In 2007 he was recognized by ACM SIGCHI with their Lifetime Achievement Award.

Foley accepted the position of chairman and CEO of Mitsubishi Electric Information Technology Center America (MEITCA) in 1998, directing corporate R&D at four labs in North America. He returned to Georgia as Executive Director and then CEO of Yamacraw, Georgia's economic development initiative in the design of broadband systems, devices and chips.

Foley became chairman of the Computing Research Association (CRA) in 2001. He stepped down from this position in 2005 but remained on CRA's board of directors until 2006.

== Foley Scholars Endowment ==
The Foley Scholars Endowment was established in honor of James Foley as part of the GVU Center's 15th anniversary celebration. The endowment funds two $5,000 scholarships awarded annually to GVU-affiliated students who demonstrate "overall brilliance and potential impact." The first two Foley Scholars were named in 2008.

== Notable awards ==
- IEEE Fellow, 1986. "For contributions to computer graphics."
- ACM SIGGRAPH Steven A. Coons Award for Outstanding Creative Contributions to Computer Graphics, 1997.
- ACM Fellow, 1999. "Through his books, courses, papers, organizational, and professional contributions, Foley has had a broad and lasting impact on the computer graphics field and on ACM."
- ACM SIGCHI Lifetime Achievement Award, 2007. "It is difficult to think of anyone who had a larger role in the institutionalization of HCI as a discipline."
- National Academy of Engineering Member, 2008. "For contributions to the establishment of the fields of computer graphics and human-computer interaction."
- Georgia Tech Class of 1934 Distinguished Professor Award, 2008. "The highest honor Georgia Tech bestows on faculty."

== Selected publications ==
- Foley, James; A. van Dam; S. Feiner; J. Hughes (1995). Computer Graphics: Principles and Practice (2nd C ed.). Reading, MA, USA: Addison-Wesley. p. 1174.
- ——; ——; ——; ——; R. Phillips (1993). Introduction to Computer Graphics. Reading, MA, USA: Addison-Wesley. p. 559.
- ——; ——; ——; —— (1990). Computer Graphics: Principles and Practice. Reading, MA, USA: Addison-Wesley. p. 1174.
- ——; —— (1982). Fundamentals of Interactive Computer Graphics. Reading, MA, USA: Addison-Wesley (IBM Systems Programming Series). p. 664. Bibcode:1982ficg.book.....F.
