= McKelvey School of Engineering =

Part of Washington University, St. Louis

James McKelvey School of Engineering
- Type: Private
- Established: 1854
- Endowment: $200 Million
- Dean: Aaron Bobick
- Faculty: 229
- Undergraduates: 1,292
- Postgraduates: 1,157
- Location: St. Louis, Missouri, USA; 38°38′56″N 90°18′08″W
- Campus: Suburban
- Website: engineering.washu.edu

The James McKelvey School of Engineering is a part of Washington University in St. Louis. Founded in 1854, the engineering school is a research institution occupying seven buildings on Washington University's Danforth Campus. Research emphasis is placed on cross-disciplinary technologies in the areas of alternative energy, environmental engineering & sustainable technology, biotechnology, information technology, and nanotechnology/materials science.

On January 31, 2019, the School of Engineering & Applied Science was renamed the James McKelvey School of Engineering, in honor of trustee and distinguished alumnus Jim McKelvey Jr., the co-founder of Square, after his donation of an undisclosed sum that the school's dean, Aaron Bobick, said has been the largest in the school's 162-year history.

Washington University finished in 2021 a $360 million campus transformation project which included the construction of two new McKelvey buildings: Henry A. and Elvira H. Jubel Hall, which houses the Department of Mechanical Engineering & Materials Science, and James M. McKelvey, Sr. Hall, which houses the Department of Computer Science & Engineering.

== Reputation ==
The Princeton Review ranks Washington University's Graduate Engineering Program 13th in the nation.

The U.S. News & World Report ranks Washington University's Undergraduate and Graduate Engineering Program 42nd and 47th in the nation, respectively.

== Departments ==
- Biomedical Engineering
- Computer Science & Engineering
- Electrical & Systems Engineering
- Energy, Environmental & Chemical Engineering
- Mechanical Engineering & Materials Science
- Professional Education: Sever Institute and the Technology & Leadership Center

== Undergraduate programs ==
=== Majors ===
- Biomedical Engineering
- Business and Computer Science
- Chemical Engineering
- Computer Engineering
- Computer Science
- Computer Science + Economics
- Computer Science + Math
- Data Science
- Electrical Engineering
- Environmental Engineering
- Mechanical Engineering
- Systems Science & Engineering

=== Minors ===
- Aerospace Engineering
- Bioinformatics
- Computer Science
- Electrical Engineering
- Energy Engineering
- Environmental Engineering
- Human-Computer Interaction
- Materials Science & Engineering
- Mechanical Engineering
- Mechatronics
- Nanoscale Science & Engineering
- Robotics
- Systems Science & Engineering

== Research Centers ==
- Cardiac Bioelectricity and Arrhythmia Center - an interdisciplinary center whose goals are to study the mechanisms of rhythm disorders of the heart, and to develop new tools for their diagnosis and treatment.
- Center for Air Pollution Impact and Trend Analysis - performs air quality research and data dissemination, maintains a literature and data library, and publishes reports and journals. CAPITA specializes in the effects of aerosol research and the impact of air pollution on the atmosphere.
- Center for Application of Information Technologies (CAIT) - provides resources, classes, training, and professional development opportunities for Information Technology leaders at Washington University and throughout the St. Louis region, in order to make the region more competitive as an IT hub.
- Institute of Materials Science - a collaboration that aims to bring together researchers in engineering, physics, chemistry, and earth and planetary sciences to "foster a culture of interdisciplinary materials science research and education at the university."
- Center for Optimization & Semantic Control - an effort between various academic divisions at Washington University, and leaders in the US Air Force and Aerospace and Air Transportation industries. The COSC works to use mathematical models and optimization problems to solve complex issues in aerospace and transportation systems.
- International Center for Advanced Renewable Energy and Sustainability - I-CARES is a $55 million effort to explore alternative solutions for fuel, by researching biofuels from plant and microbial systems to forward sustainable alternative environmental practices.
- McDonnell Center for the Space Sciences - A coordinated effort between the School of Engineering, and the departments of Earth and Planetary Sciences, Physics, and Chemistry in the College of Arts and Sciences. Groups work to research broad questions in the space sciences, such as the formation of planets, the beginning of the Universe, and geologic activity on Earth. A unique, state-of-the-art microprobe known as Cameca NanoSIMS analyzes cosmic dust, and recently separated and identified individual presolar dust grains that forms around new stars.
- National Science Foundation Science and Technology Center for Engineering MechanoBiology - CEMB is a $24 million effort, conducted jointly between Washington University in St. Louis and the University of Pennsylvania, to "how single cells function in hopes to use the research to prevent disease and promote more efficient crop practices."
- Photosynthetic Antenna Research Center - aspires to maximize photosynthetic antenna efficiency in living organisms and to fabricate robust micron-scale biohybrid light-harvesting systems to drive chemical processes or generate photocurrent.
