= GVU Center at Georgia Tech =

US research center

Coordinates: 33.777297°N 84.390031°W

The GVU Center logo

The GVU Center at Georgia Tech (formerly the Graphics, Visualization and Usability Center) is an interdisciplinary research center located near Technology Square in Atlanta, Georgia, United States, and affiliated with the Georgia Institute of Technology. It was founded by James D. Foley, the Center's first director, on October 15, 1992. According to U.S. News & World Report, it is one of the best such facilities in the world. The GVU Center's current director is W. Keith Edwards, Georgia Tech alum and Professor in the School of Interactive Computing.

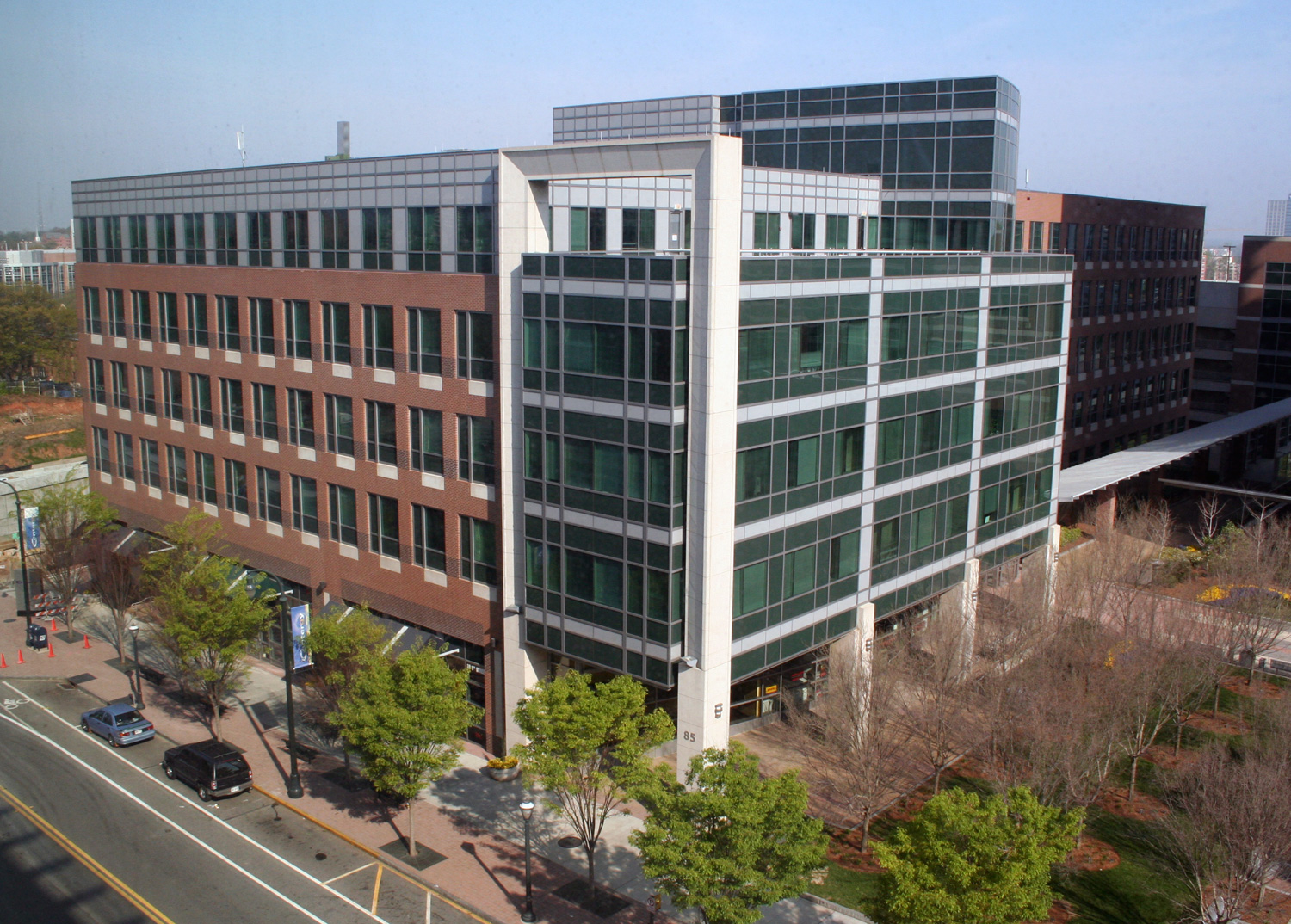
The GVU Center encompasses the second and third floors of the Technology Square Research Building.

The GVU Center focuses on human-computer interaction, ubiquitous computing, mixed/augmented reality, computer animation/graphics, wearable computing, information visualization, educational technologies (learning sciences and technology), new media, communications, intelligent systems, human robot interaction, computer supported cooperative work, social computing, and online communities.

== History ==
In 1988, two Georgia Tech faculty members, Larry Hodges and Bill Ribarsky, created the Georgia Tech Computer Graphics Interest Group. The popularity of this group led Hodges and Ribarsky to expand it into a Scientific Visualization Lab. This lab later merged with the Biomedical Visualization Lab, Animation Lab, and Video Lab to form the Georgia Tech Imaging Consortium. Professor James Foley renamed this entity the Graphics, Visualization, and Usability (GVU) Center in early 1991. The GVU Center moved into a 3,000 square foot research space in 1992, provided by the Georgia Tech College of Computing. In 2006, the GVU Center relocated to expanded facilities in the Technology Square Research Building (TSRB).

== Directors ==
Five people have served as directors of the GVU Center since its founding:

- James D. Foley (1991-1996)
- Jarek Rossignac (1996-2001)
- Aaron Bobick (2001-2005)
- Elizabeth D. Mynatt (2005-2011)
- W. Keith Edwards (2011–present)

== See also ==
- Georgia Institute of Technology School of Interactive Computing
