= List of Georgia Institute of Technology alumni =

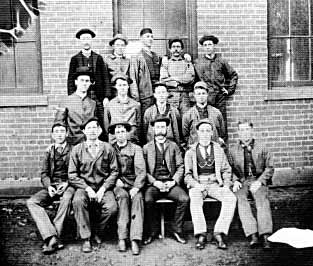
Georgia Tech's first two graduates were Henry L. Smith (top row, center) and George G. Crawford (top row, far right).

This list of Georgia Institute of Technology alumni includes graduates, non-graduate former students, and current students of Georgia Tech. Notable administration, faculty, and staff are found on the list of Georgia Institute of Technology faculty. Georgia Tech alumni are generally known as Yellow Jackets. According to the Georgia Tech Alumni Association,

[the status of "alumni"] is open to all graduates of Georgia Tech, all former students of Georgia Tech who regularly matriculated and left Georgia Tech in good standing, active and retired members of the faculty and administration staff, and those who have rendered some special and conspicuous service to Georgia Tech or to [the alumni association].

The first class of 128 students entered Georgia Tech in 1888, and the first two graduates, Henry L. Smith and George G. Crawford, received their degrees in 1890. Smith would later lead a manufacturing enterprise in Dalton, Georgia and Crawford would head Birmingham, Alabama's large Tennessee Coal, Iron, and Railway Company. Since then, the institute has greatly expanded, with an enrollment of 19,505 undergraduates and 28,441 postgraduate students as of fall 2023.

== Award winners ==
=== Nobel laureates ===
Name	Class year	Notability	References
Jimmy Carter	1946	Transferred to United States Naval Academy; 39th president of the United States (1977–1981); 2002 Nobel Peace Prize laureate; Georgia senator (1962–1966); 76th governor of Georgia (1971–1975)	
Kary Mullis	1964	Won the 1993 Nobel Prize in Chemistry for his development of the Polymerase chain reaction (PCR), a central technique in biochemistry and molecular biology which allows the amplification of specified DNA sequences	

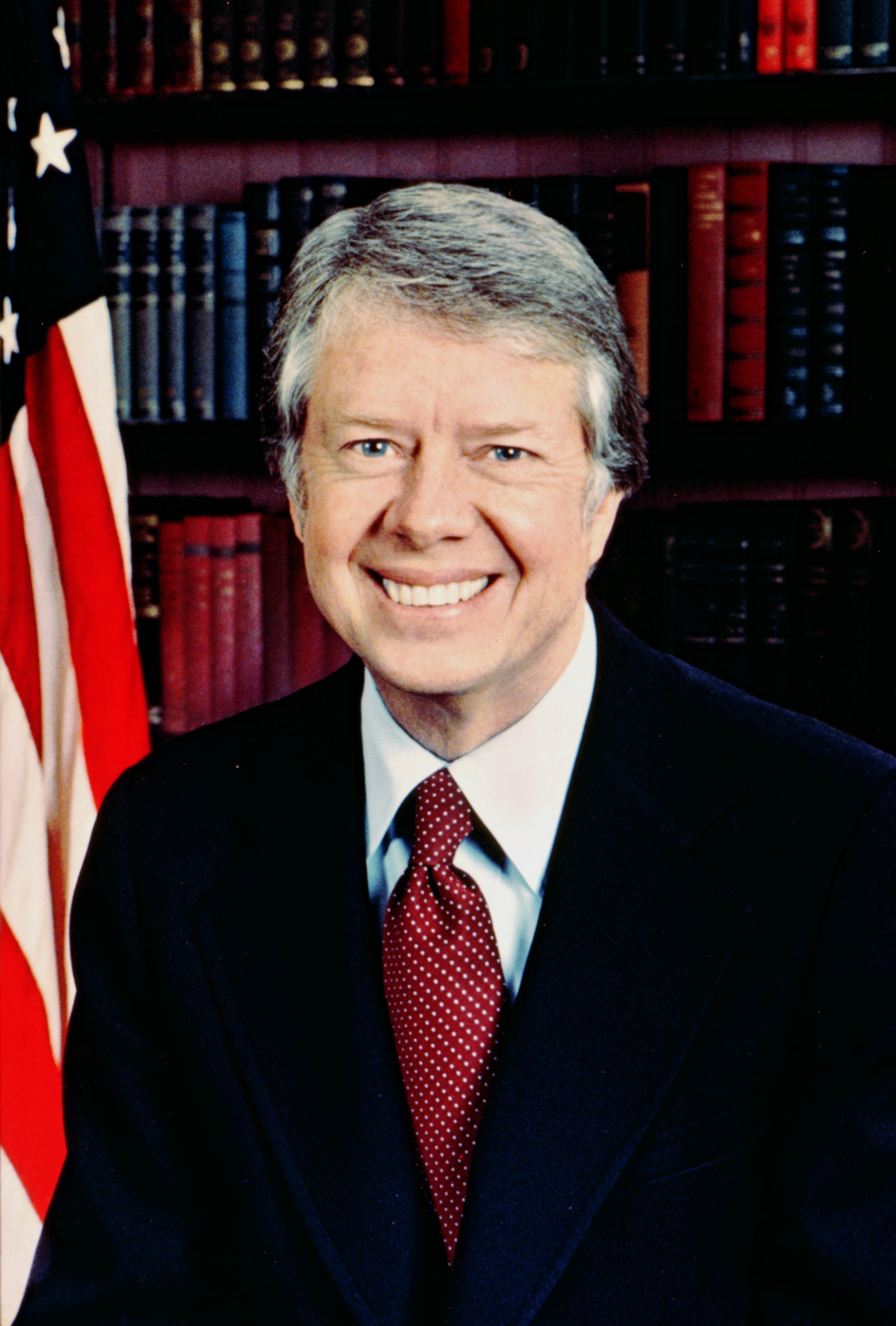
Jimmy Carter

=== Scholars ===
Name	Class year	Notability	References
Joy Buolamwini	2012	2013 Rhodes Scholar, 2012 Fulbright Fellow (Zambia)	
David Eger	2003	2003 Fulbright Scholar (Hungary)	
Will Roper	2001	2002 Rhodes Scholar; 2001 Truman Scholar	

== Public figures ==
=== Business ===
Name	Class year	Notability	References
Rawi Abdelal	1993	Professor of business administration at Harvard Business School	
Dean Alford	1976	President and CEO of Allied Energy Services; convicted criminal	
Ronald W. Allen	1964	President, chairman and CEO of Delta Air Lines (1987–1997); chairman and CEO of Aaron's, Inc. (2012–2014)	
Gil Amelio	1965	CEO emeritus of National Semiconductor and Apple; IEEE Fellow	
Charles "Garry" Betty	1979	President and CEO of EarthLink (1996–2007)	
W. Frank Blount	1961	Businessman, chairman and CEO of venture capital firm JI Ventures, Inc.; former chairman and CEO of Cypress Communications Inc.; former director and CEO of Telstra in Australia	
John F. Brock	1971	Chairman and CEO of Coca-Cola Enterprises Inc.	
Paul J. Brown	1989	CEO of Inspire Brands	
Gary C. Butler	1968	CEO of Automatic Data Processing	
Brook Byers	1968	Venture capitalist of Kleiner Perkins Caufield & Byers	
Ben Chestnut	1998	Co-founder and CEO, MailChimp	
George G. Crawford	1890	Headed the Tennessee Coal, Iron and Railroad Company	
Cecil B. Day	1958	Founder of Days Inn Hotels	
David Dorman	1975	Chairman and CEO emeritus of AT&T Corporation	
Mike Duke	1971	Former president and CEO of Wal-Mart Stores	
Walter Ehmer	1989	President and CEO of Waffle House	
David C. Garrett Jr.	1955	CEO of Delta Air Lines (1978–1987)	
Jaime Gilinski	1978	Chairman of JGB Financial Holding Company	
Frank Gordy	1929	Founder of The Varsity chain, which includes the world's largest drive-in	
James Gulliver	1950	Founder of Argyll Foods, one of the United Kingdom's largest retail businesses	
Dennis Hayes	1973	Founder of Hayes Communications, an early developer of PC modems	
Ed Iacobucci	1975	Leader of the IBM OS/2 Design Team; founder of Citrix Systems; president and CEO of DayJet; member of SCO Group's board of directors	
Chris Klaus	1994	Founder and current CEO of Kaneva, Inc.; co-founder and former CTO of Internet Security Systems; his company was acquired by IBM for over $1.3 billion; donated $15 million to Georgia Tech toward the construction of the Klaus Advanced Computing Building, which is named after him	
Roger Krone	1978	CEO of Leidos Holdings Inc.	
Alan J. Lacy	1975	Last chairman and CEO of Sears, Roebuck and Company	
Mike Levy	1969	Founder and current CEO of Maxxpoint.com; founder and former president, chairman and CEO of Sportsline.com, now CBSSports.com	
David S. Lewis Jr.	1939	Major force in the aerospace and defense industry for three decades	
Calvin Mackie	1996	Award-winning mentor; motivational speaker; entrepreneur	
Scottie Mayfield	1973	President of Mayfield Dairy Farms	
Robert Milton	1983	Former chairman, president and CEO of Air Canada; former chairman of the board of directors of United Continental Holdings, the parent company of United Airlines	
Charles Moorman	1975	Former CEO of Norfolk Southern, current CEO of Amtrak	
Blake Moret	1985	Current president and CEO of Rockwell Automation Inc.	
David Perdue	1972	Former CEO of Dollar General and Reebok International; former Georgia US senator	
J. Paul Raines	1985	CEO of GameStop	
Hazard E. Reeves	1928	Introduced magnetic stereophonic sound to motion pictures; was president of over 60 companies, including Cinerama	
Glen P. Robinson	1948	Researcher at the Georgia Tech Research Institute; went on to found Scientific Atlanta	
James D. Robinson III	1957	CEO of American Express Co. (1977–1993); director of The Coca-Cola Company (1975–present)	
Joe Rogers Jr.	1968	Longtime CEO of Waffle House	
Chuck Sannipoli	1967	Executive in the data networking industry; Senior Member of the IEEE	
Derek V. Smith	1979	CEO of ChoicePoint (1997–2008)	
Mark C. Smith	1962	Co-founder of ADTRAN, Inc.	
E. Roe Stamps	1967	Founding managing partner of venture capital firm Summit Partners; member of the Georgia Tech Foundation Board of Trustees	
Henry Grady Weaver	1911	Director of Customer Research Staff for General Motors Corporation, appeared on the cover of the November 14, 1938 issue of Time magazine	
George W. Woodruff	1917	Engineer, businessman, and philanthropist who gave generously to both Georgia Tech and Emory University; namesake of the George W. Woodruff School of Mechanical Engineering	

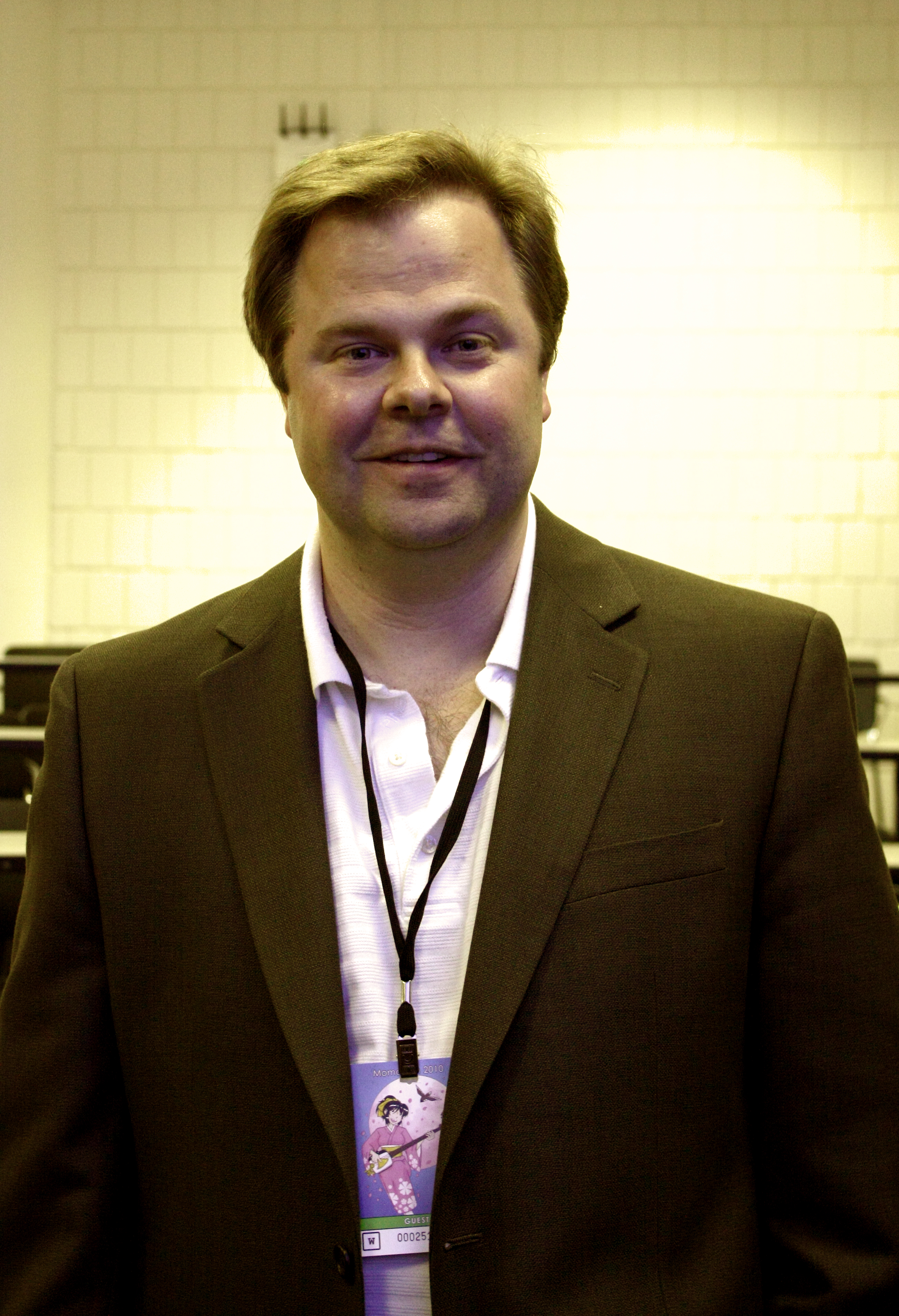
Chris Klaus

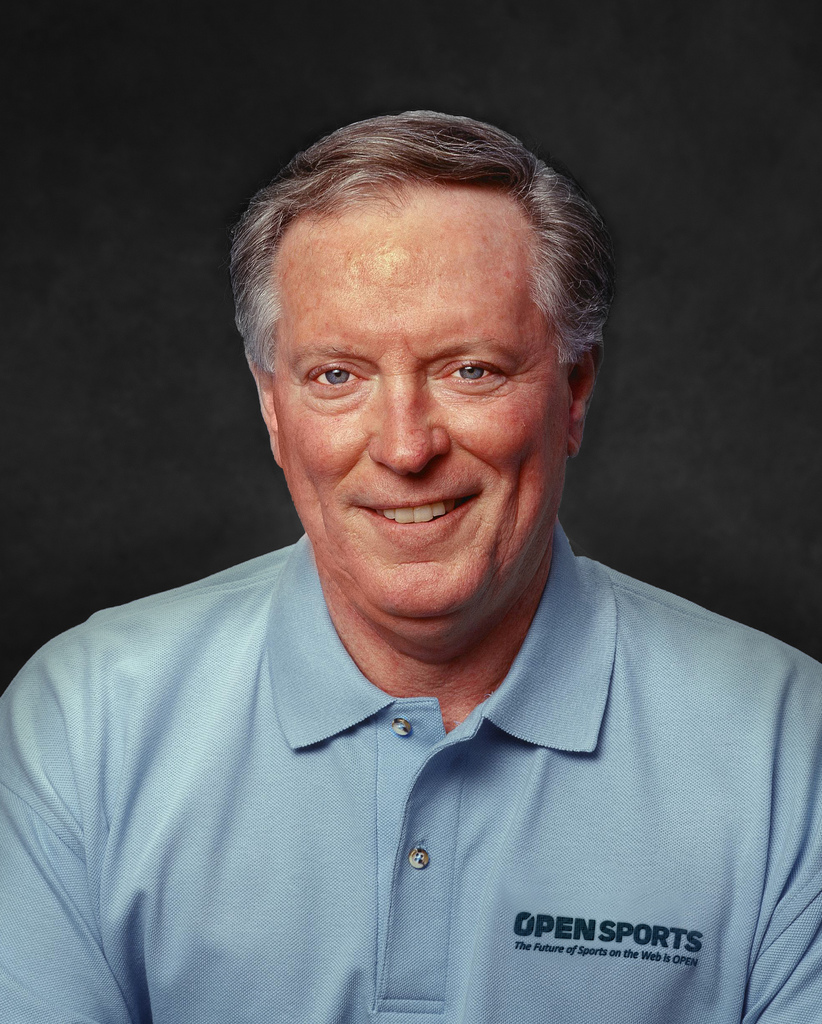
Mike Levy

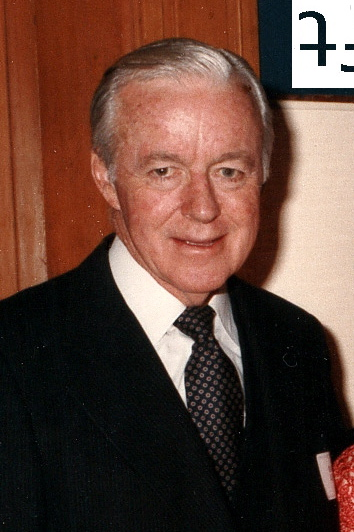
David S. Lewis Jr.

=== Education ===
Name	Class year	Notability	References
Lori Mann Bruce		Seventh chancellor of the University of Tennessee at Chattanooga (2025-)	
G. Wayne Clough	1964	Georgia Tech president (1994–2008); secretary of the Smithsonian Institution (2008–2015)	
Robert H. Frank	1966	Chaired professor of management and economics at the Samuel Curtis Johnson Graduate School of Management at Cornell University; contributor to the "Economic View" column, which appears every fifth Sunday in The New York Times	
Y. Frank Freeman	1910	Movie executive with Paramount Pictures; first winner of Jean Hersholt Humanitarian Award; helped establish and was first president of both the Georgia Tech Alumni Association and the Georgia Tech Foundation	
George C. Griffin	1922	Long-time dean of students at Georgia Tech	
Evelynn M. Hammonds	1976	Barbara Gutmann Rosenkrantz Professor of History of Science and African American Studies at Harvard University and dean of Harvard College (2008–2013)	
Carolyn Meyers	1979	President of Jackson State University, previously president of Norfolk State University 2006–2010	
Deepak Hegde	2004	Seymour Milstein Professor of Strategy, New York University Stern School of Business	

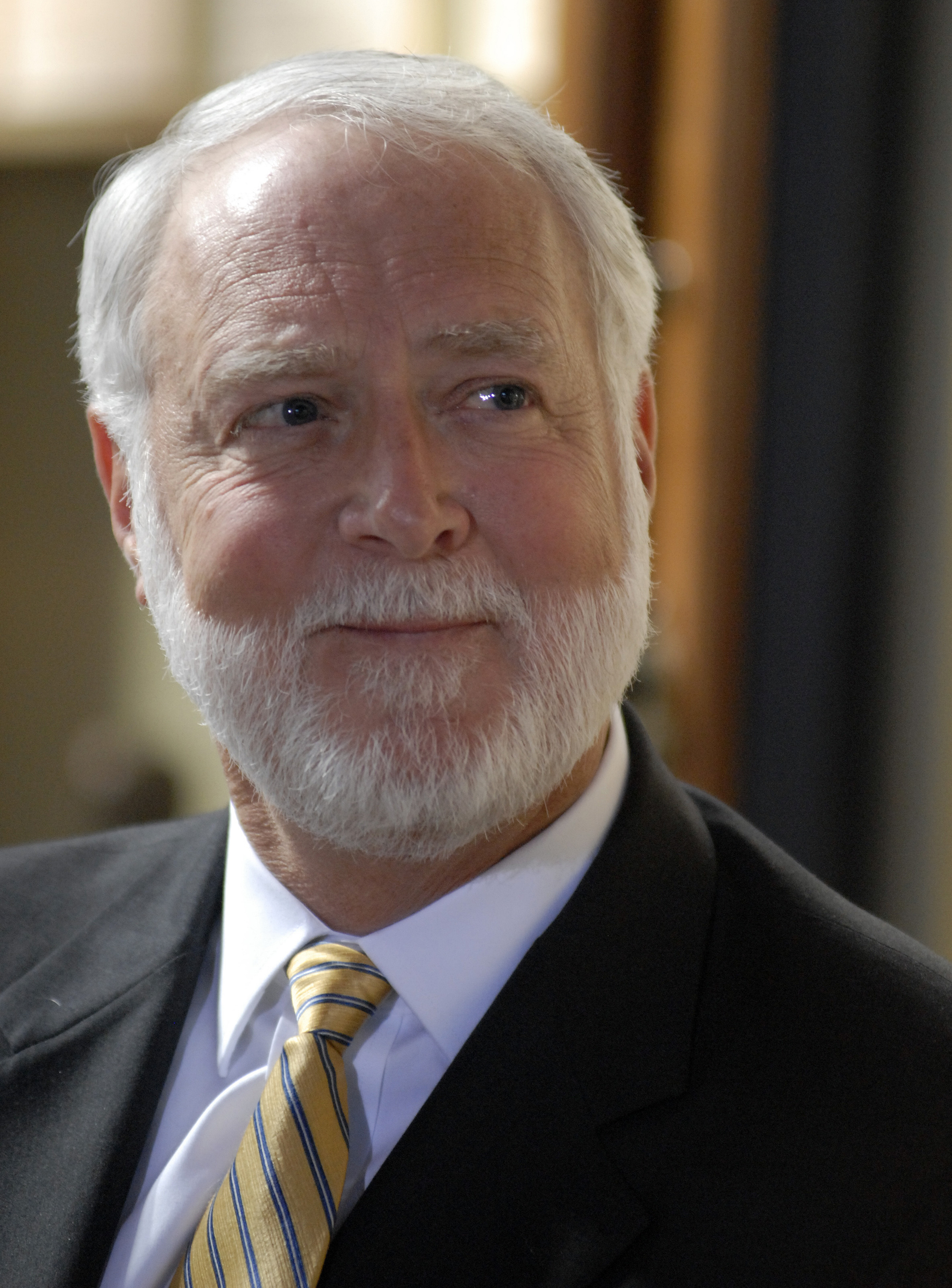
G. Wayne Clough, former president of Georgia Tech

=== Politics and public service ===
Name	Class year	Notability	References
Dean Alford	1976	Convicted criminal; former member of the Georgia General Assembly (1983–1993); president and CEO of Allied Energy Services	
Ivan Allen Jr.	1933	Mayor of Atlanta (1962–1970)	
Raymond W. Baker	1957	Director of Global Financial Integrity, a think tank in Washington, DC	
Timothy Batten	1981	United States federal judge since his nomination by George W. Bush in 2005 and confirmation in 2006	
Max Burns	1973	Georgian member of the US House of Representatives (2003–2005)	
Charles M. Brown	1925	Member of the Georgia State Senate (1957–1964); chairman of commission (1945–1947, 1976–1978, 1966, 1968, 1971, 1974); Fulton County commissioner (1941–1948, 1966–1979)	
Howard Callaway	1945	Businessman; US Secretary of Army (1973–1975); Georgian member of US House of Representatives (1965–1967)	
Mario Canahuati	1977	Advisor of Honduras Government team during the negotiations of CAFTA; former Honduras ambassador in the US; former Secretary of Foreign Affairs of Honduras; affiliated with PNH	
Jack Carter	1972	Businessman and politician; son of Jimmy Carter	
Jimmy Carter	1946	Transferred to United States Naval Academy; 39th president of the United States (1977–1981); 2002 Nobel Peace Prize laureate; member of the Georgia State Senate (1962–1966); 76th governor of Georgia (1971–1975)	
Andre Dickens	1998	Mayor of Atlanta (2022–present)	
J. Owen Forrester	1961	United States federal judge since his appointment by Ronald Reagan in 1981	
Phil Gingrey	1965	Georgian member of US House of Representatives (2003–2015)	
Johnny Grant	1972	Member of the Georgia State Senate representing the 25th district of Georgia	
Jack Guynn	1969	Former president and CEO of the Federal Reserve Bank of Atlanta; member of Oxford Industries' board of directors	
John W. Keys	1964	Director of the United States Bureau of Reclamation (2001–2006)	
Jon C. Kreitz	1986	Nominated by the president to serve as the Assistant Secretary of the Air Force for Manpower and Reserve Affairs (September 2020)	
Tom Moreland	1955	30+ year career with the Georgia Department of Transportation, commissioner and/or chief engineer for the last 17 years; namesake of the Tom Moreland Interchange	
Sam Nunn	1956	Georgian member of the US Senate (1972–1997); CEO of Nuclear Threat Initiative; received an honorary doctorate from Georgia Tech in 2008	
Stephen Pace	1912	Georgian member of the US House of Representatives (1937–1951); member of the Georgia State Senate (1923–1924); member of the Georgia House of Representatives (1917–1920)	
E. Earl Patton	1949	Georgia state senator and Atlanta businessman; first Republican to run for US senator from Georgia (1968) since Reconstruction	
Paul Craig Roberts	1961	Economist and political pundit; served as undersecretary of the treasury under Ronald Reagan	
Chip Rogers	1991	Politician in the Georgia General Assembly since 2002; selected as Georgia State Senate Majority Leader in 2009	
Mark D. Sickles	1984	Politician in the Virginia House of Delegates since November 2003	
Orson Swindle	1959	Commissioner of the Federal Trade Commission of the United States (1997–2005); decorated Vietnam War prisoner of war	
Juan Carlos Varela	1985	Former vice president of Panama 2009–2014; former president of Panama 2014–2019	
Daniel Webster	1971	Speaker of the Florida House of Representatives; longest-serving Florida legislator	
Rufus W. Youngblood	1950	United States Secret Service agent who shielded Lyndon B. Johnson in the assassination of John F. Kennedy	

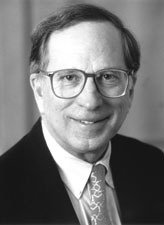
Sam Nunn, former U.S. senator and CEO of the NTI

=== Military service ===
Name	Class year	Notability	References
Edward C. Aldridge Jr.	1962	Served in many top U.S. Defense Department and defense industry jobs, including as the 16th Air Force secretary	
William L. Ball	1969	67th Secretary of the Navy (March 28, 1988 – May 15, 1989)	
John Boyd	1964	USAF fighter pilot, engineer and military strategist	
Philip M. Breedlove	1977	Retired four-star general in the United States Air Force and former Vice Chief of Staff of the United States Air Force	
John M. Brown III	1969	Commander of United States Army Pacific Command	
Ray Davis	1938	Assistant commandant of the USMC; Korean War Medal of Honor recipient	
James O. Ellis	1970	Retired four-star admiral; former commander of United States Strategic Command, Offutt Air Force Base	
Pete Geren	1973	Served as the 20th United States Secretary of the Army from July 16, 2007 to September 16, 2009; former member of the United States House of Representatives from Texas; currently president of the Sid W. Richardson Foundation in Fort Worth, Texas	
Russell D. Hale	1969	United States Assistant Secretary of the Air Force (Financial Management & Comptroller) (1981–1984)	
Haywood S. Hansell	1924	USAF major general; air combat commander and strategist of the United States Army Air Forces during World War II	
Hugh W. Hardy	1944	United States Marine Corps Reserves major general; geoscientist	
John W. Hendrix	1965	Retired United States Army four-star general who served as commander, United States Army Forces Command (1999–2001)	
Jon C. Kreitz	1986	United States Navy rear admiral	
Orlando Llenza	1951	Second Puerto Rican to reach the rank of major general in the USAF	
James C. McConville	1990	Retired four-star United States Army general, served as the 40th chief of staff of the Army 2019–2023	
Thomas McGuire	1941	Second leading USAAF ace of World War II with 38 victories; Medal of Honor recipient	
Peter M. Rhee	1983	Surgeon, medical professor, and military veteran; spent 24 years in the United States Navy serving as a battlefield casualty physician in Afghanistan and Iraq	
Stuart C. Satterwhite	1991	United States Navy rear admiral	
William G. Thrash	1939	Retired United States Marine Corps three-star general; highly decorated naval aviator	
James A. Winnefeld Jr.	1978	United States Navy four-star admiral who served as the vice chairman of the Joint Chiefs of Staff; former fourth commander, U.S. Northern Command (USNORTHCOM) and 21st commander, North American Aerospace Defense Command (NORAD)	
Leonard Wood	1894	Medal of Honor recipient, governor-general of the Philippines and Cuba, 5th Chief of Staff of the Army	

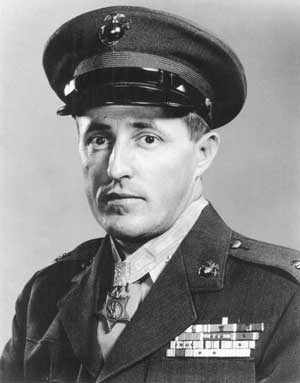
General Ray Davis

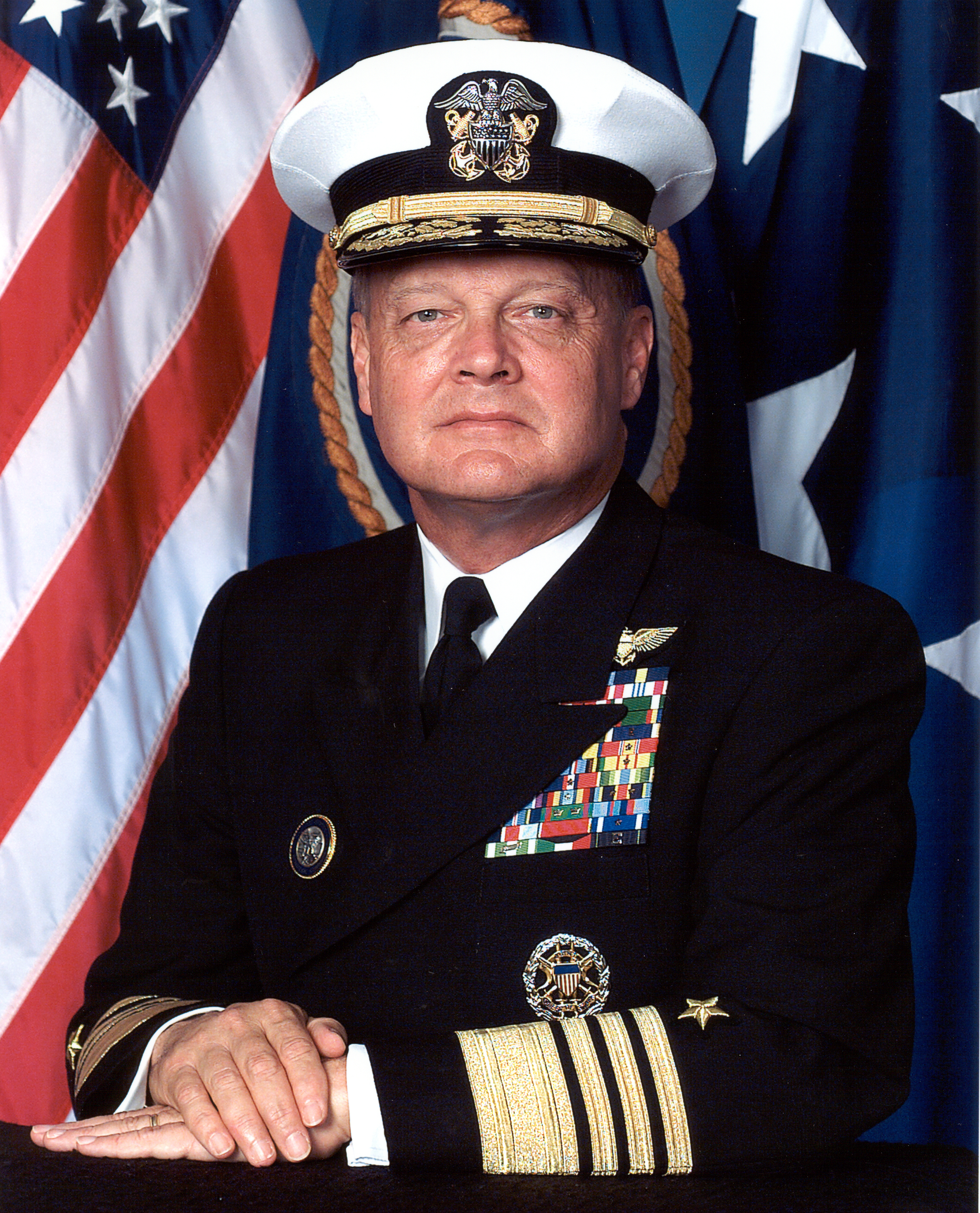
Admiral James O. Ellis

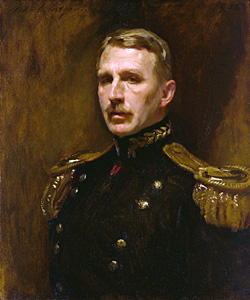
Major General Leonard Wood

== Science and engineering ==
=== NASA and aerospace ===
Name	Class year	Notability	References
Eric Boe	1997	NASA astronaut (STS-126, STS-133)	
Michael R. Clifford	1982	NASA astronaut (STS-53, STS-59, STS-76); former US Army lieutenant colonel	
Jan Davis	1975	Retired NASA astronaut (STS-47, STS-60, STS-85); current director of the Safety and Mission Assurance directorate at Marshall Space Flight Center	
James Henry Deese	1935	NASA administrator	
Ben T. Epps	1904	Known as "Georgia's first aviator"; aviation pioneer; in 1907, he built a monoplane of his own design, now known as the Epps 1907 Monoplane, followed by other original monoplane and biplane designs	
Gabriel Georgiades	1979	Professor of aerospace engineering at California State Polytechnic University, Pomona	
L. Blaine Hammond	1974	Retired NASA astronaut (STS-39, STS-64)	
Charlie Hillard	1958	Aerobatics pilot; first American to win the world aerobatics title	
Scott J. Horowitz	1982	Retired NASA astronaut (STS-75, STS-82, STS-101, STS-105)	
Ellis L. Johnson	1960	Coca-Cola Chaired Professor in the H. Milton Stewart School of Industrial and Systems Engineering at Georgia Tech	
Susan Still Kilrain	1985	Retired NASA astronaut (STS-83, STS-94)	
Robert S. Kimbrough	1998	NASA astronaut (STS-127); among the first candidates selected for astronaut training in the United States following the Space Shuttle Columbia disaster	
Charles Kohlhase	1957	Worked for forty years at NASA/JPL leading the design of several robotic deep-space planetary missions	
Timothy Kopra	1995	NASA astronaut (STS-127); flight engineer and science officer of the International Space Station; US Army lieutenant colonel	
Sandra Magnus	1996	NASA astronaut (STS-112, STS-126, STS-119, STS-135); member of the ISS Expedition 18	
William S. McArthur	1983	NASA astronaut (STS-58, STS-74, STS-92); veteran of three Space Shuttle missions; veteran of one mission to the International Space Station via the Russian Soyuz capsule	
Yvonne Pendleton	1979	Chief scientist and first director of NASA’s Solar System Exploration Research Virtual Institute; first director of the NASA Lunar Science Institute	
Alan G. Poindexter	1986	NASA astronaut (STS-122, STS-131)	
James R. Thompson Jr.	1958	Director of the NASA Marshall Space Flight Center in Huntsville, Alabama (1986–1989); NASA's deputy director (1989–1991)	
Joe F. Thompson	1971	Aerospace engineer and chaired professor at Mississippi State University known for contributions to the field of computational fluid dynamics	
Sabrina Thompson	2009	Aerospace engineer at Goddard Space Flight Center and founder of fashion brand Girl in Space Club	
Richard H. Truly	1959	Retired NASA astronaut (Approach and Landing Tests, STS-2, STS-8); retired vice admiral in the United States Navy; 8th administrator of NASA (1989–1992); head of the Georgia Tech Research Institute (1993–1998)	
Douglas H. Wheelock	1992	NASA astronaut (STS-120, Soyuz TMA-19, Expedition 24/25)	
John Young	1952	Retired NASA astronaut (Gemini 3, Gemini 10, Apollo 10, Apollo 16, STS-1, STS-9); first commander of the Space Shuttle, walked on the Moon during Apollo 16	

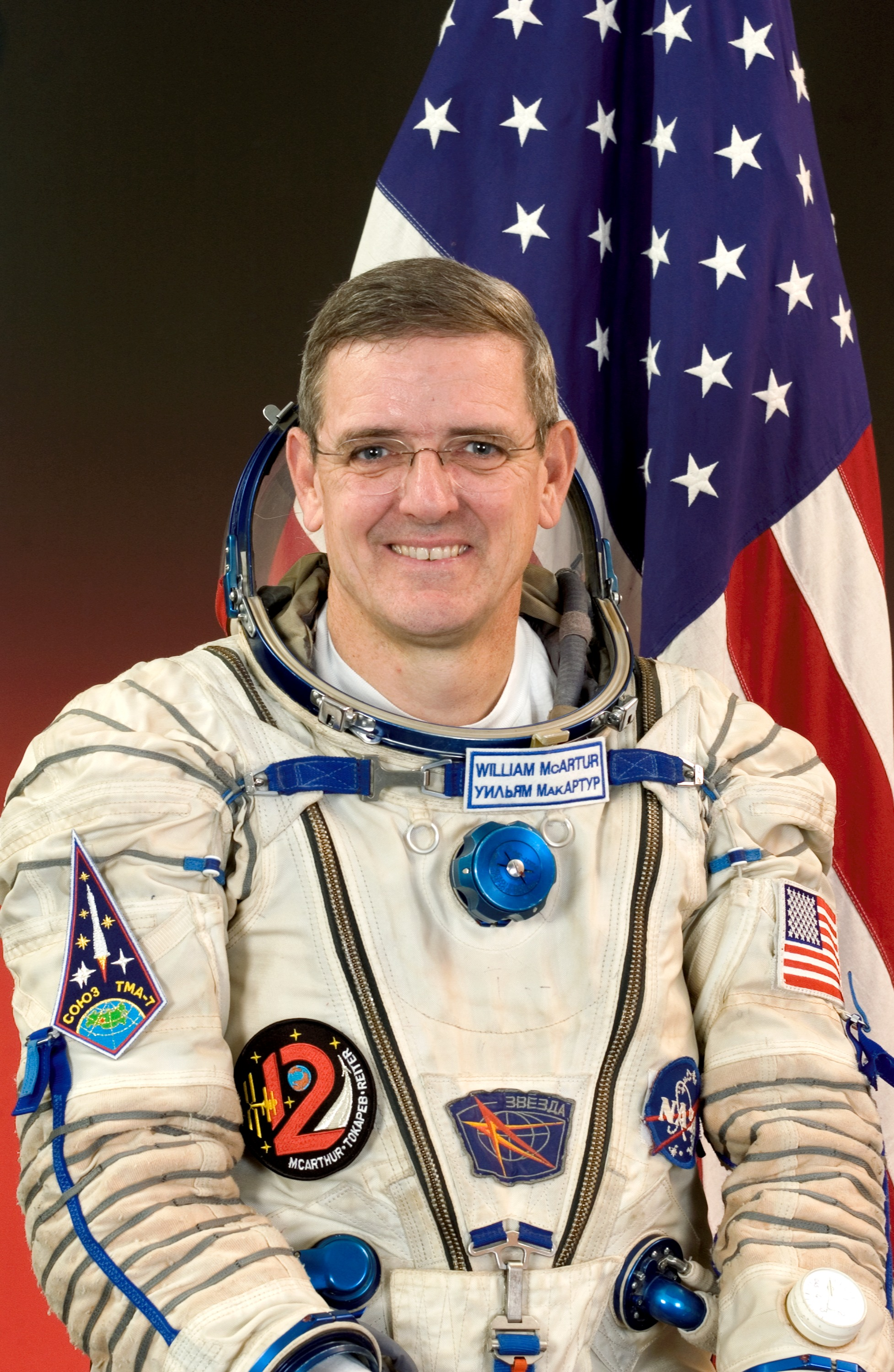
William S. McArthur, astronaut

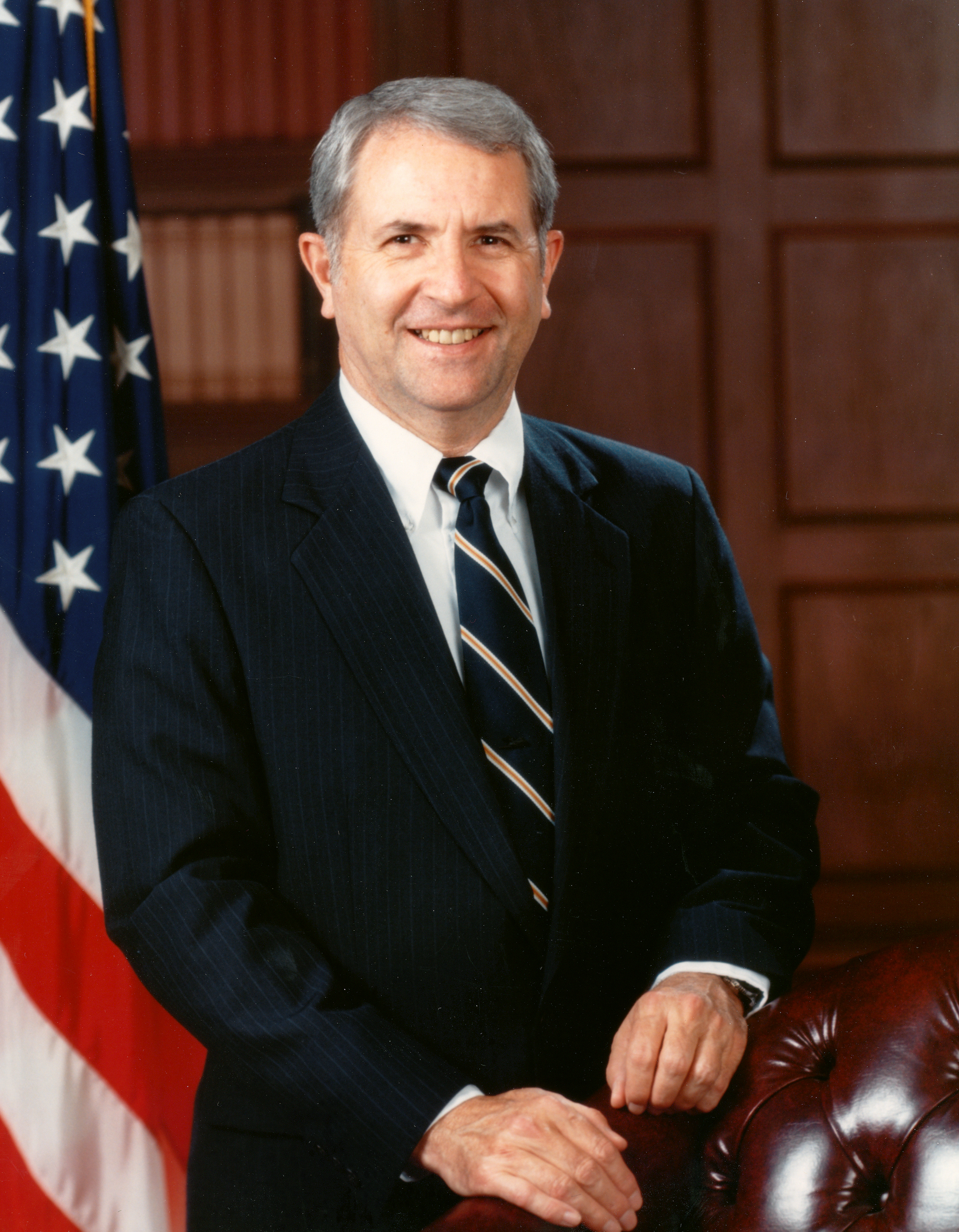
Richard H. Truly, retired vice admiral, former head of NASA and GTRI

=== Physics ===
Name	Class year	Notability	References
Bascom S. Deaver	1952	Physicist known for his research into superconductor applications; professor and assistant chairman for undergraduate studies of the physics department at the University of Virginia	
Robert V. Gentry	1963	Nuclear physicist and young Earth creationist, known for his claims that radiohalos provide evidence for a young age of the Earth; entered the physics doctoral program at Georgia Tech, but left when he was refused permission to work on the age of the Earth for his dissertation	
Arnold Hardy	1945	Physicist and amateur photographer who won the 1947 Pulitzer Prize for Photography	
Hagen Kleinert	1964	Professor of theoretical physics at the Free University of Berlin	
Kenneth Lane	1964	Physicist; physics professor at Boston University	
Earl W. McDaniel	1948	Regents Professor of Physics at the Georgia Institute of Technology and the Georgia Tech Research Institute; known for his contributions to the field of ion-mobility spectrometry	
W. Jason Morgan	1957	Geophysicist who has made seminal contributions to the theory of plate tectonics and geodynamics; 2003 National Medal of Science recipient; geosciences professor at Princeton University	

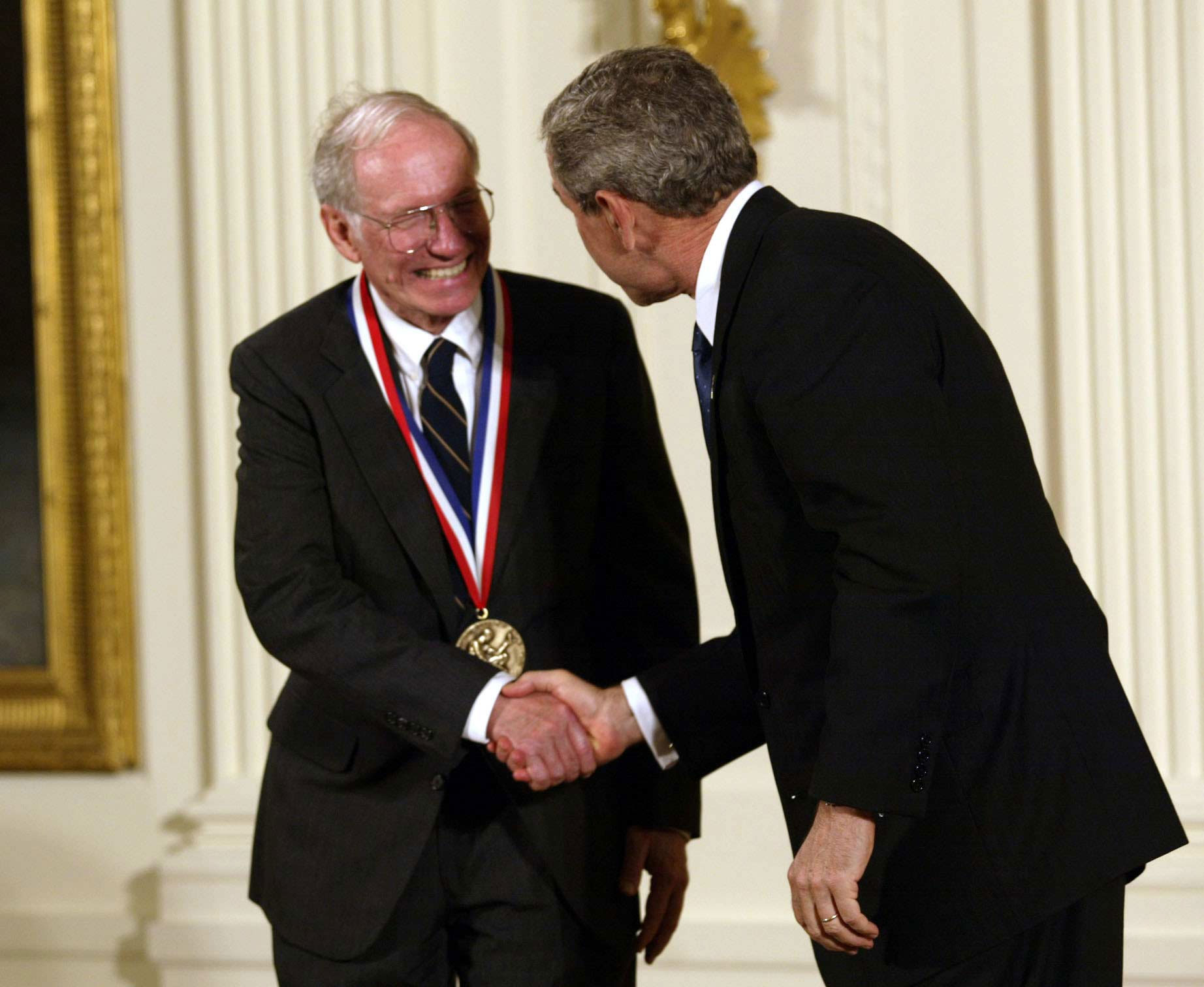
W. Jason Morgan, 2003 National Medal of Science recipient

Kenneth Lane, theoretical particle physicist

=== Chemistry and biology ===
Name	Class year	Notability	References
Anthony J. Arduengo III	1974	Chemist known for his work in the field of stable carbene research	
Paul K. Calaway	1933	Chemical engineer and the director of the Georgia Tech Research Institute (1954–1957)	
Ronald Collé	1969	Specialist in nuclear and radiochemistry and radionuclidic metrology	
James R. Fair	1942	Chemical engineer who worked in a variety of industrial positions, primarily for Monsanto Company; then joined academia and held a named chair at the University of Texas at Austin School of Chemical Engineering	
Irving Geis	1927	Artist who worked closely with biologists; his hand-drawn work depicts many structures of biological macromolecules, such as DNA and proteins	
Linda Griffith	1982	Biomedical engineer and professor of biological engineering and mechanical engineering at Massachusetts Institute of Technology	
Valerie Montgomery Rice	1983	Reproductive endocrinology researcher; president of Morehouse School of Medicine; Member of the National Academy of Medicine	
Kary Mullis	1964	Won the 1993 Nobel Prize in Chemistry for his development of the Polymerase chain reaction (PCR), a central technique in biochemistry and molecular biology which allows the amplification of specified DNA sequences	
David Rasnick	1978	Biochemist; AIDS denialist; former president of the Group for the Scientific Reappraisal of the HIV-AIDS Hypothesis	
Wyatt C. Whitley	1934	Chemist, professor of chemistry and director of the Georgia Tech Research Institute (1963–1968)	

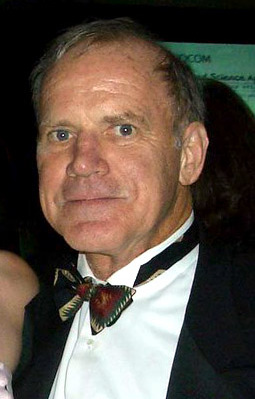
Kary Mullis, who won the 1993 Nobel Prize in Chemistry

=== Engineering ===
Name	Class year	Notability	References
Joe Brooks	1982	Director of the Georgia Tech Research Institute's Electronic Systems Laboratory	
Wallace H. Coulter	1934	Electrical engineer; inventor; businessman; discovered the Coulter principle, which provides a methodology for counting, measuring and evaluating microscopic particles suspended in fluid; namesake of Georgia Tech and Emory's Wallace H. Coulter Department of Biomedical Engineering	
Ali Erdemir	1982	Turkish materials scientist specializing in surface engineering and tribology	
David Frakes	2003	Distinguished Faculty Fellow in biomedical engineering at the Georgia Institute of Technology	
Don Giddens	1963	Dean of Georgia Tech's College of Engineering (1992–2011)	
Samuel Graham	1999	Eugene C. Gwaltney Jr. School chair and professor at Georgia Tech	
Linda Griffith	1982	Biological engineer; MacArthur "Genius" Fellow, National Academy of Engineering	
Paula T. Hammond	1988	Polymer engineer; head of the MIT Department of Chemical Engineering; fellow of the National Academies of Sciences, Engineering, and Medicine	
John Calvin Jureit	1949	Inventor of the Gang-Nail connector plate	
Dean Kamen	2008	Entrepreneur and inventor; received honorary doctorate from Georgia Tech in 2008	
James Lansford	1982	Fellow of the Institute of Electrical and Electronics Engineers	
Michel G. Malti	1922	Electrical engineer known for his work in circuit analysis	
Gary S. May	1985	Former dean of the Georgia Tech College of Engineering; notable in the field of computer-aided manufacturing of integrated circuits	
Tom McDermott	1982	Deputy director and director of research at the Georgia Tech Research Institute since 2007; previously chief engineer and program manager for Lockheed Martin's F-22 Raptor Avionics Team	
Robert C. Michelson	1974	Roboticist; recipient of the 2001 Pirelli Award; recipient of 2001 Top Pirelli Prize; inventor of the Entomopter	
Lane Mitchell	1929	Ceramic engineer at Georgia Tech and the founder of its Department of Ceramic Engineering, now known as Georgia Tech's School of Materials Science and Engineering	
Bryan Nesbitt	1988	Automobile designer; head of General Motors Corporation International Operations Design; transferred to Art Center College of Design after his first year at Georgia Tech	
Sanjay Raman	1987	Dean of the University of Massachusetts Amherst College of Engineering	
Reisha Raney		Engineer and CEO of Encyde Corporation	
Herbert Saffir	1940	Developer of the Saffir–Simpson Hurricane Scale	
Jeff S. Shamma	1983	Control theorist, professor and Julian T. Hightower Chair in Systems and Controls in Georgia Tech's School of Electrical and Computer Engineering	
John E. Till	1976	PhD in nuclear engineering; retired rear admiral of the United States Naval Reserve; 1984 recipient of the Ernest Orlando Lawrence Award	
W. Harry Vaughan	1923	Professor of ceramic engineering at Georgia Tech and the founder and first director of what is now the Georgia Tech Research Institute	
Harrison Wadsworth Jr.	1949	Professor of industrial engineering at Georgia Tech; supply sergeant during World War II and the Korean War	
B. N. Wilson	1896	Professor, engineer, and college football coach; professor of mechanical engineering and the head football coach at Arkansas Industrial University (now known as the University of Arkansas)	

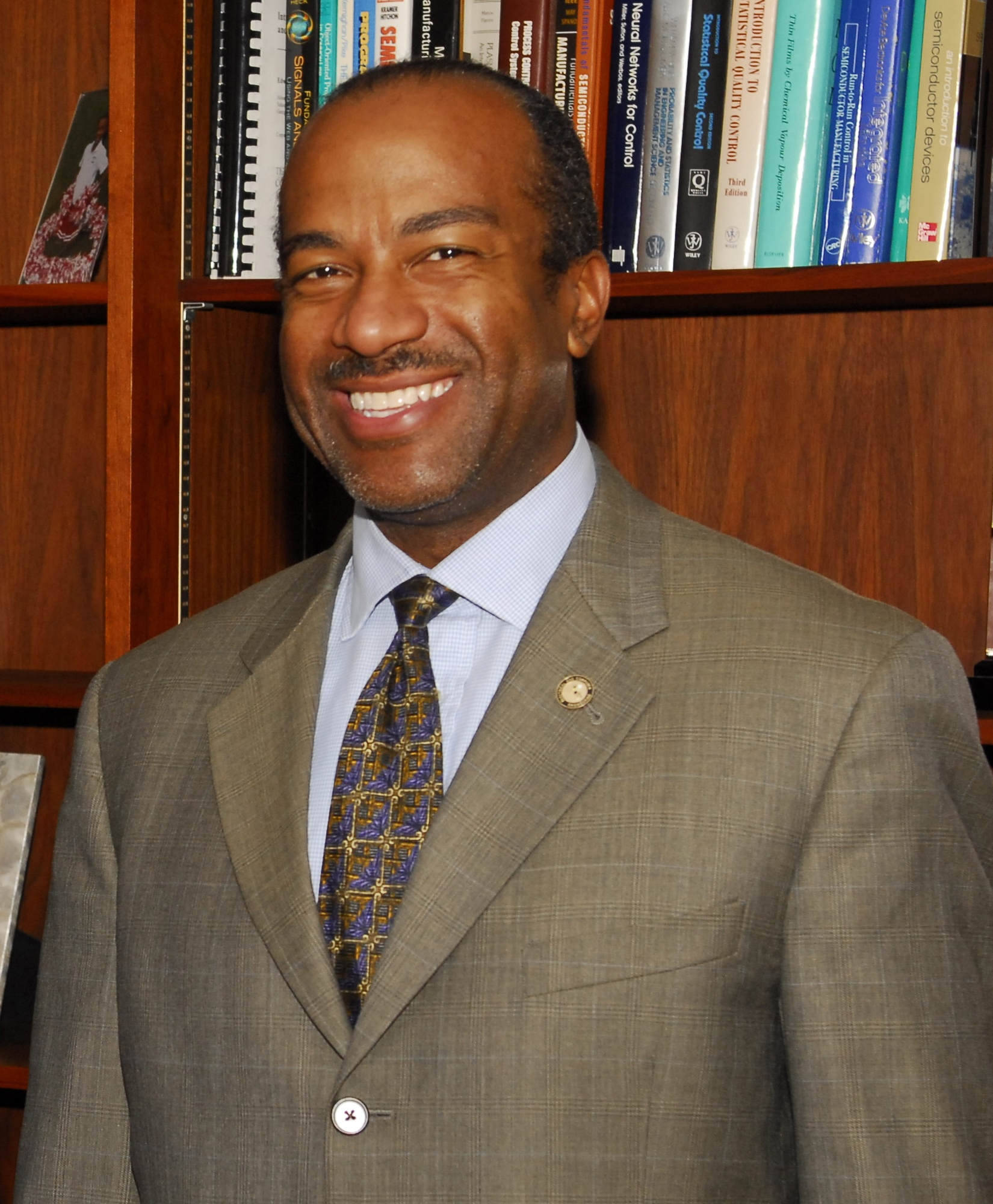
Gary S. May, Current President of the University of California Davis, and Former Dean of the Georgia Tech College of Engineering

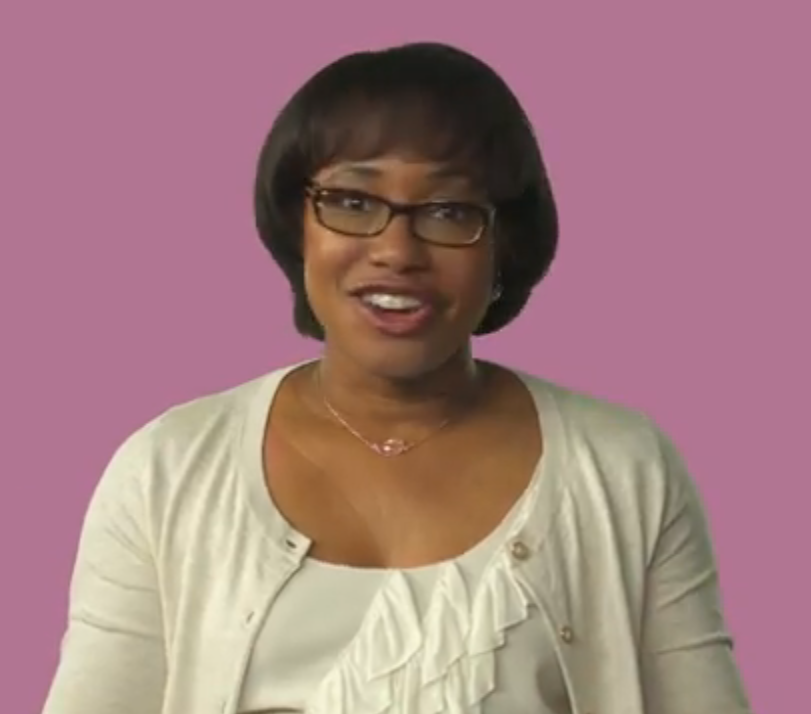
Paula T. Hammond

=== Computer and information science ===
Name	Class year	Notability	References
Yaser S. Abu-Mostafa	1981	Computer science professor at California Institute of Technology; machine learning expert	
Jim Allchin	1984	Former high-level executive at Microsoft	
Eric Allender	1985	Computer Science professor at Rutgers University, where he chaired the Department of Computer Science 2006–2009	
Annie Antón	1997	Chair and professor, School of Interactive Computing (Georgia Tech); professor of software engineering at NCSU; privacy expert	
Krishna Bharat	1996	Google research scientist; creator of Google News	
Fabian E. Bustamante	2001	Computer science professor at Northwestern University	
Joe Celko	1982	Relational database expert from Austin, Texas; participated in the ANSI X3H2 Database Standards Committee; helped write the SQL-89 and SQL-92 standards	
Dorothy M. Crosland	1961	Long-time head librarian of the Georgia Tech Library, awarded honorary degree in 1961	
Tom Cross	1999	Entrepreneur; computer security expert; hacker	
Jim Davies	1997	Cognitive scientist, playwright, artist; assistant professor of cognitive science at the Institute of Cognitive Science at Carleton University in Ottawa, Ontario, Canada, where he is the director of the Science of Imagination Laboratory	
Richard DeMillo	1974	Former dean of the Georgia Tech College of Computing; distinguished professor of Computing; previous director of the Georgia Tech Information Security Center	
Anind Dey	1995	Computer scientist, currently an associate professor and the director of the Human-Computer Interaction Institute at Carnegie Mellon University	
W. Keith Edwards	1989	Director of the GVU Center (Georgia Tech); professor of School of Interactive Computing at Georgia Tech; former manager of the Ubiquitous Computing group at PARC	
Chaim Gingold	2003	Noted for his work with Spore	
Candace Mitchell Harris	2011	Co-founder and CEO of Myavana	
D. Richard Hipp	1984	Architect and primary author of SQLite	
Ed Iacobucci	1975	Leader of the IBM OS/2 design team; founder of Citrix Systems; president and CEO of DayJet; member of SCO Group's board of directors	
James Mickens	2001	Computer science professor at Harvard; distributed systems expert	
Craig Mundie	1972	Chief research and strategy officer at Microsoft	
Elizabeth Mynatt	1989	Executive director, Institute for People and Technology (IPaT) at Georgia Tech; director of the GVU Center at Georgia Tech; associate dean of strategic planning, Georgia Tech College of Computing	
James F. O'Brien	2000	Computer science professor at University of California, Berkeley	
Jeff Offutt	1988	Computer science professor of software engineering at George Mason University; software testing expert; editor-in-chief of Software Testing, Verification & Reliability journal	
Shwetak Patel	2003	Computer science entrepreneur and professor at University of Washington	
Rosalind Picard	1984	Founder and director of the Affective Computing Research Group at MIT	
Mike Pinkerton	1997	Software developer working on the Mozilla browsers and Google Chrome browser; lectures on "Development of Open Source Software" at George Washington University	
Anand Sivasubramaniam	1995	Computer science distinguished professor at The Pennsylvania State University	
Alex Snoeren	1997	Computer science professor at University of California, San Diego	
Gene Spafford	1981	Computer science professor at Purdue University; computer security expert	
Neha Narkhede	2007	Co-Created Apache Kafka while working at LinkedIn. Co-Founder of Confluent and CTO until 2020.	

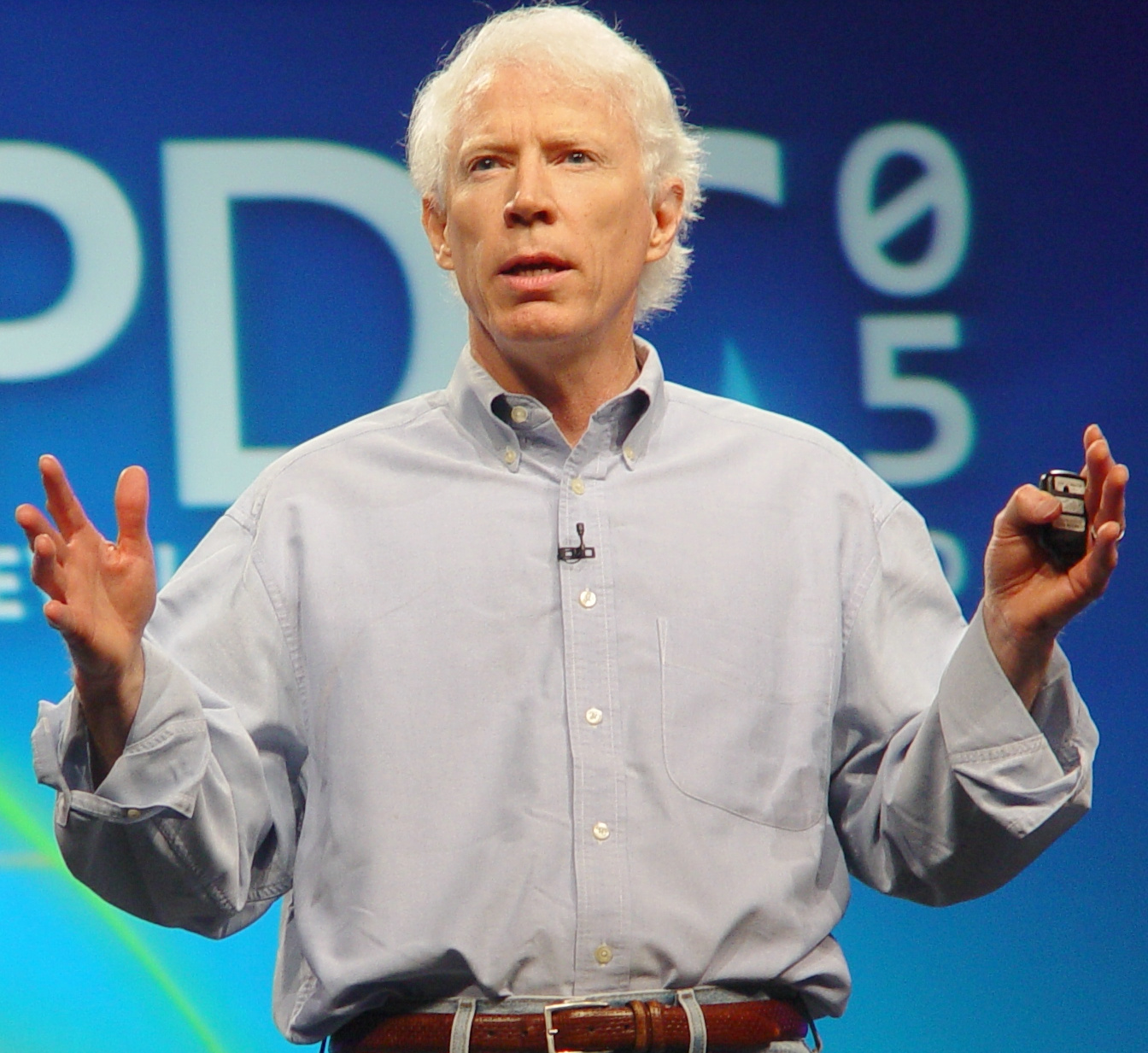
Jim Allchin, former executive at Microsoft

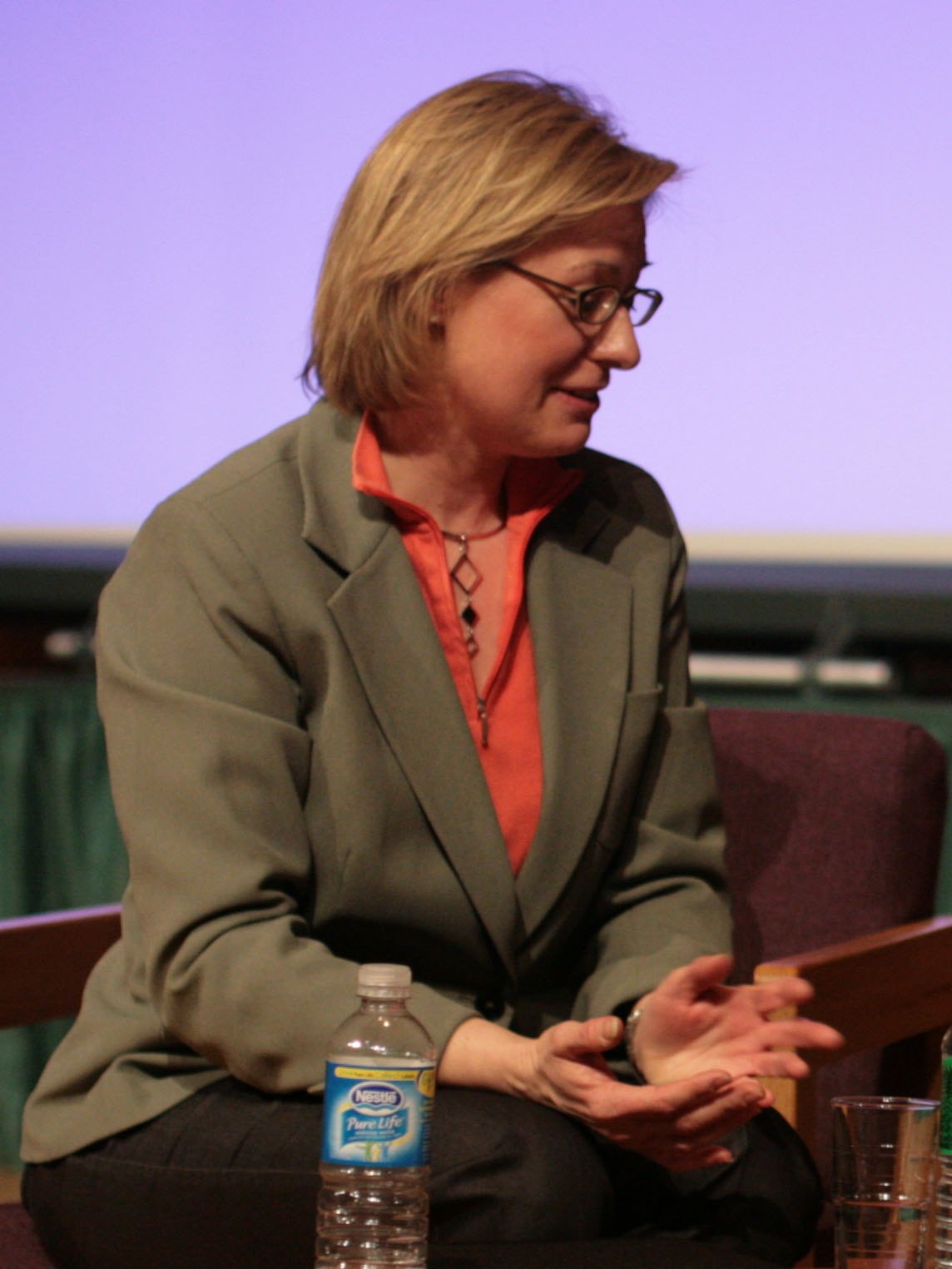
Rosalind Picard

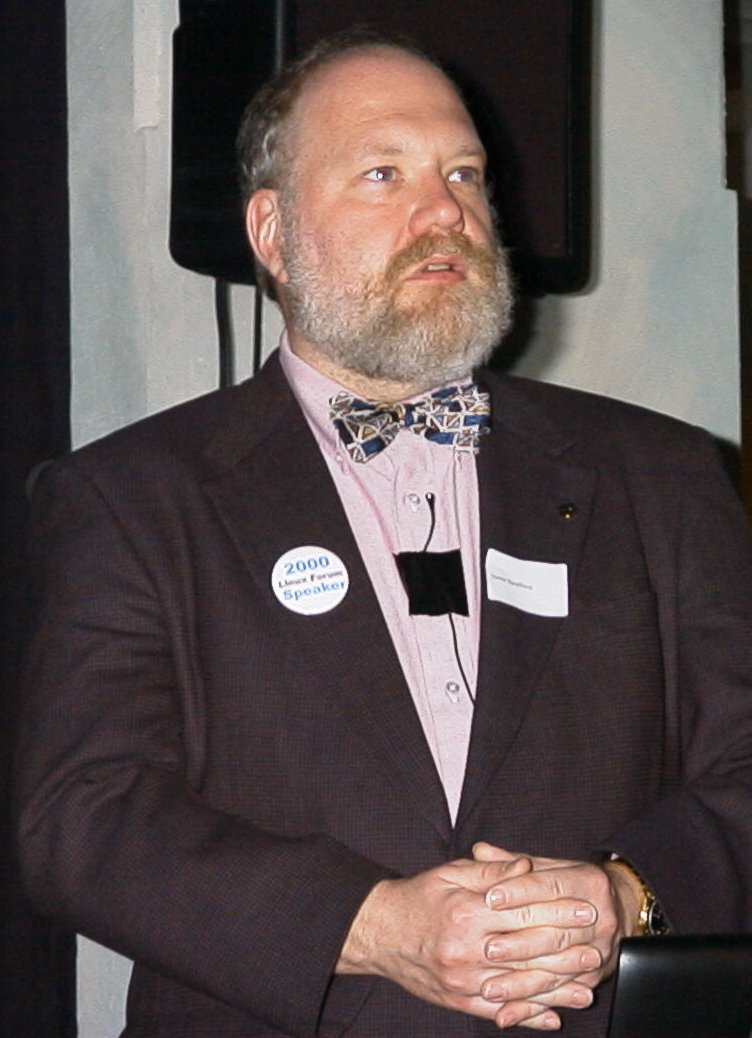
Gene Spafford

=== Mathematics ===
Name	Class year	Notability	References
Hermann Flaschka	1967	Mathematical physicist and professor of mathematics at the University of Arizona, known for contributions to completely integrable systems (soliton equations)	
Herbert Keller	1945	Applied mathematician; numerical analyst; professor of applied mathematics, emeritus, at the California Institute of Technology	
Daniel P. Sanders	1993	Created a new, efficient proof for the four color theorem	

=== Atmospheric science ===
Name	Class year	Notability	References
Vernon R. Morris	1991	Atmospheric scientist, foundation professor and associate dean of the Knowledge Enterprise in the New College of Interdisciplinary Arts and Sciences at Howard University, emeritus professor in the Department of Chemistry and the former director of the Atmospheric Sciences Program at Howard University, 2018 recipient of the American Meteorological Society Charles E. Anderson award and the 2020 Presidential Citation for Science and Society from the American Geophysical Union	
Shannon Valley	2019	Climate scientist and policy advisor	

== Humanities ==
=== Architecture and design ===
Name	Class year	Notability	References
Cecil Alexander	1937	Architect; transferred to Yale after his first year at Georgia Tech	
Michael Arad	1999	Designer architect of the World Trade Center Memorial in New York City, selected from 5,201 competitors as the winning designer with "Reflecting Absence"	
Bill Finch	1936	Architect and founder of architectural firm FABRAP	
Preston Geren Jr.	1947	Fort Worth architect who designed Burnett Plaza	
George T. Heery	1951	Atlanta architect who developed several important architectural concepts and founded Heery International	
Jan Lorenc	1994	Designer; co-owner of Lorenc+Yoo Design	
John C. Portman Jr.	1950	Architect who designed several high-profile buildings, including SunTrust Plaza, and the Westin Peachtree Plaza Hotel	
L. W. "Chip" Robert Jr.	1908	Founder of Atlanta engineering and architectural firm Robert and Company; namesake of the L. W. "Chip" Roberts, Jr. Alumni House, which houses the offices of the Georgia Tech Alumni Association; Assistant Treasurer of the United States (1933–1936)	
Hugh Stubbins	1933	Architect who designed several high-profile buildings, including Yokohama Landmark Tower, Citigroup Center, and Kongresshalle	
Vern Yip	1995	Designer on reality program Trading Spaces	

=== Arts and entertainment ===
Name	Class year	Notability	References
Robert L. Bidez	1912	First director of the Georgia Tech Yellow Jacket Marching Band, which he founded in 1908 as a student	
Jim Butterworth	1984	Technology entrepreneur and documentary filmmaker; director and producer of the award-winning film Seoul Train, holder of numerous U.S. and foreign patents in the field of streaming media	
Jorge Cham	1997	Creator of Piled Higher and Deeper comics; post-doctoral instructor and researcher at Caltech	
Jeff Crouse	2006	Artist and hacker/creative technologist who works with live data feeds from the internet to make artwork	
James Crumley	1958	Author of violent hardboiled crime novels and several volumes of short stories and essays, as well as published and unpublished screenplays	
Ed Dodd	1925	20th-century cartoonist; known for his Mark Trail comic strip	
Lamar Dodd	1928	Painter known for work portraying the American South	
Jeff Foxworthy	1979	Comedian and creator/producer of the Blue Collar Comedy Tour; host of both the network and syndicated versions of Are You Smarter Than a 5th Grader?	
Danny Gonzalez	2016	Popular Youtuber and Vine personality	
Phil Gordon	1991	Professional poker player	
Bones Howe	1956	Grammy-award-winning record producer and recording engineer associated with 1960s and 1970s hits, mostly of the sunshine pop genre, including most of the hits of The 5th Dimension and The Association	
Mark Lee	1995	Member of the Christian band Third Day	
Jarvis Johnson	2014	Popular commentary youtuber	
Nicole Jordan	1976	Best-selling author of romance novels	
Nagesh Kukunoor	1993	Bollywood movie director and actor	
Edlyn Lewis	1998	1998 Miss Georgia USA; competitor in the Miss USA 1998 pageant	
Vivek Maddala	1995	Composer and musician	
Matt Moulthrop	2004	Woodturner and artist	
Arthur Murray	1923	Dance instructor and businessman	
Wallace Potts	1970	Independent film director; archivist for the Rudolf Nureyev Foundation	
Andy Runton	1998	BS 1998, MS 2000, both in Industrial Design; creator of the Owly graphic novels	
John Salley	1988	Co-host of The Best Damn Sports Show Period and former NBA player	
Randolph Scott	1924	Movie star of the 1940s and 1950s	

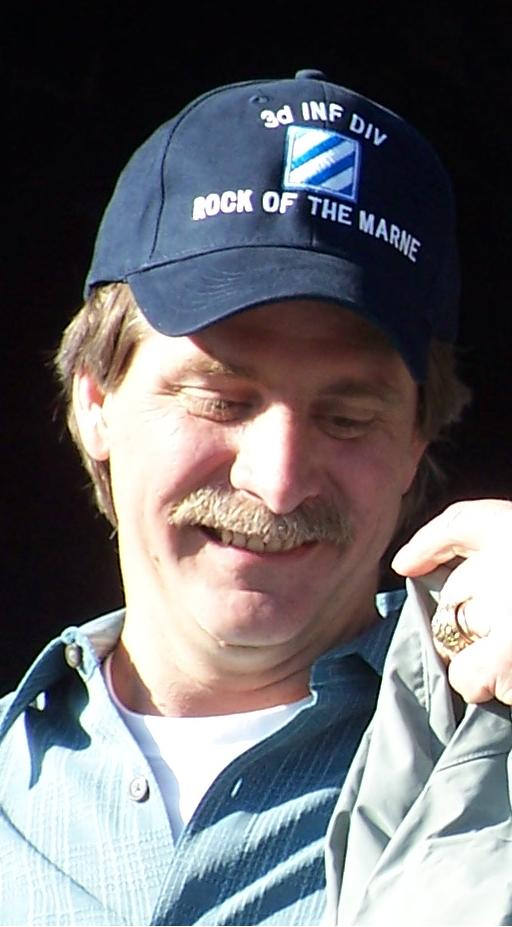
Jeff Foxworthy, comedian

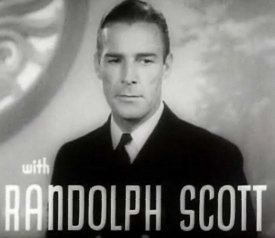
Randolph Scott

== Athletics ==
Despite their highly technical backgrounds, Tech graduates are no strangers to athletics; approximately 150 Tech students have gone into the NFL, with many others going into the NBA or MLB. Well-known American football athletes include former students Calvin Johnson, Daryl Smith, the late Demaryius Thomas, and Keith Brooking, former Tech head football coaches Pepper Rodgers and Bill Fulcher, and all-time greats such as Joe Hamilton, Pat Swilling, Billy Shaw, and Joe Guyon. Tech's recent entrants into the NBA include Javaris Crittenton, Thaddeus Young, Jarrett Jack, Luke Schenscher, Stephon Marbury, Derrick Favors, Iman Shumpert, Chris Bosh, and Travis Best. Award-winning baseball stars include Kevin Brown, Mark Teixeira, Nomar Garciaparra, Jason Varitek, Erskine Mayer, and Jay Payton. In golf, the legendary Bobby Jones founded The Masters, David Duval was ranked No. 1 in the world in 2001; Stewart Cink was the 2009 Open Championship winner anf was ranked in the top ten; and Matt Kuchar won the U.S. Amateur.

== Fictional people ==
Name	Class year	Notability	References
Hannah Arroyo	NA	NASA aerospace engineer who went to Georgia Tech for undergrad in Ali Hazelwood's book Below Zero	
George P. Burdell	NA	Fictitious student officially enrolled in 1927, and who has been continuously enrolled since his "graduation" in 1930	
Charlie Croker	NA	Character in Tom Wolfe's A Man in Full	
Robert W. Graves	NA	G.I. Joe character known as "Grunt"	
S.R. Hadden	NA	Business magnate and character in Contact	
Barbara "Bobbi" Morse	NA	Marvel Comics superheroine Mockingbird; former Agent of S.H.I.E.L.D., and a member of the New Avengers	
Two Bits Man	NA	Anonymous humor columnist; typically majoring in a computer-related discipline	
