= Samuel Graham =

Samuel Graham may refer to:

- Samuel Graham (British Army officer) (1756–1831)
- Samuel Graham (engineer), American engineer
- Samuel Jordan Graham (1859–1951), American judge
- Samuel C. Graham (1846–1923), Virginia lawyer and judge
- Sam Graham (born 2000), English footballer

== See also ==
- Sam Graham (footballer, born 1874), Scottish footballer
- Sam Graham-Felsen, American blogger and journalist
