= Deese =

Deese is a surname. Notable people with the surname include:

- Brian Deese (born 1978), American political advisor
- Derrick Deese (born 1970), American football player
- Derrick Deese Jr. (born 1998), American football player
- James Henry Deese (1914–2001), American aerospace engineer
- Rupert Deese (1924–2010), American ceramic artist
