= Kreitz =

Kreitz is a surname. Notable people with the surname include:

- Jon C. Kreitz (born 1963), American Navy officer
- Ralph Kreitz (1885–1941), American baseball player
- Willy Kreitz (1903–1982), Belgian Olympic ice hockey player and sculptor
