= Gary Butler =

Gary Butler may refer to:

- Gary Butler (linebacker) (born 1984), American football linebacker
- Gary Butler (tight end) (born 1951), American football tight end
- Gary C. Butler, CEO and president of Automatic Data Processing
