= Fritz Herzog =

American mathematician

Fritz Herzog (6 December 1902 to 21 November 2001) was an American mathematician known for his work in complex analysis and power series.

He was born in Germany and studied at the University of Berlin until 1934 when he moved to United States. He received his Ph.D. degree at Columbia University with the thesis Systems of Algebraic Mixed Difference Equations advised by Joseph Ritt (1934). Herzog was an electrical engineering research associate at Cornell University (1938–43), working with Michel G. Malti on dynamo research. Together they solved an important electric power problem on balancing dynamos, which had remained open since the days of Michael Faraday a century before. Most of his career was spent at Michigan State University (1943–73) where he gave his name to the Fritz Herzog Prize Endowment Fund.

Herzog died in East Lansing of prostate cancer.

He was married to Helen (née Korngold) Herzog.
