= Tom McDermott (engineer) =

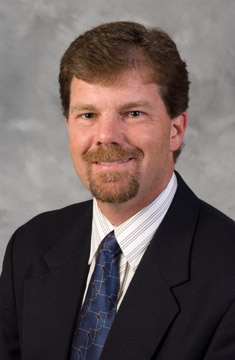
- Born: United States
- Education: Georgia Institute of Technology
- Known for: Systems engineering
- Scientific career
- Fields: Physics
- Workplaces: Stevens Institute of Technology, Georgia Tech Research Institute, Georgia Institute of Technology, Lockheed Martin

Tom McDermott is the deputy director of the Systems Engineering Research Center at Stevens Institute of Technology, a position he has held since March 2018.

== Early life and education ==
McDermott attended the Georgia Institute of Technology, where he received a Bachelor of Science in physics in 1982, and a Master of Science in electrical engineering in 1984. While at Georgia Tech, he played drums in the Georgia Tech Yellow Jacket Marching Band.

== Career ==
=== Lockheed Martin ===
On graduation, McDermott joined the nearby Lockheed Martin Aeronautical Systems in Marietta, Georgia where he would eventually be chief engineer and program manager for Lockheed Martin's F-22 Raptor Avionics Team. McDermott worked for Lockheed Martin from 1984 to 2002.

=== Georgia Tech ===
In 2002, McDermott joined the Georgia Tech Research Institute's Electronic Systems Laboratory, where he assumed control of their largest contract, the C-130 Avionics Modernization Program (AMP). In 2006, McDermott was promoted to Director of the Electronic Systems Laboratory.

While at Georgia Tech, McDermott was involved in the creation of a new professional master's degree program in systems engineering, a collaboration between GTRI and the College of Engineering. He taught short courses on topics including electronic warfare principles, systems engineering team leadership, and earned value principles.

In September 2007, McDermott was named deputy director and Director of Research of GTRI, where he oversaw GTRI's research agenda, its seven research labs, field offices, and new operations in Athlone, Ireland. He held both positions through August 2013, during which time he was Interim Director of GTRI between Stephen E. Cross's start as Executive Vice President for Research on May 1, 2010, and the placement of former GTRI director Robert McGrath on February 1, 2011.

=== Stevens Institute of Technology ===
McDermott is currently the deputy director of the Systems Engineering Research Center (SERC) at Stevens Institute of Technology. He works in multiple technology fields but focuses both his research and teachings in systems engineering areas, including the importance of leadership in engineering. His current research includes "innovation models, strategic foresight techniques, system data analytics, and modeling and simulation of policy implications in current and future complex systems," and he aims to continue his research by looking into developing technology to aid in more rapid systems development and learning.
