= GTRI Health and Environmental Systems Laboratory =

The Health and Environmental Systems Laboratory (HESL) was one of eight labs in the Georgia Tech Research Institute. In mid-2006, it was disbanded, and the staff were transferred to other parts of GTRI. ELSYS, the largest lab within GTRI, received most of the personnel.

== Overview ==
Researchers in HESL worked in biomedical diagnostics and therapeutics, in environmental assessment and remediation, and in the intersection between health and the built environment: green buildings, smart and sustainable urban neighborhoods, and healthy environments.

== Organization and research areas ==
The Health Systems Division conducted research and development in the areas of diagnostic sensors, biomarkers, vision enhancement, materials characterization and delivery, and advanced prosthetics. The Environmental Systems Division conducted research and development in the areas of air and water quality, hazardous materials, sustainable facilities, and environmental sensors. It was also involved in energy-related issues as they impact the environment.

The Food Processing Technology Division conducted significant research in improving the production and quality of food while minimizing the environmental impacts of the industry. This program was designed to enhance the productivity of Georgia’s agribusiness and the competitiveness of Georgia’s food processing, applying computer vision, robotics, plant ergonomics, biosensors, and wearable computer technology. The Occupational Safety and Health Division offered programs of technical assistance on-site at private and public facilities, along with research and development of cost-effective solutions.
