= Sabrina Thompson =

American aerospace engineer (born 1985)

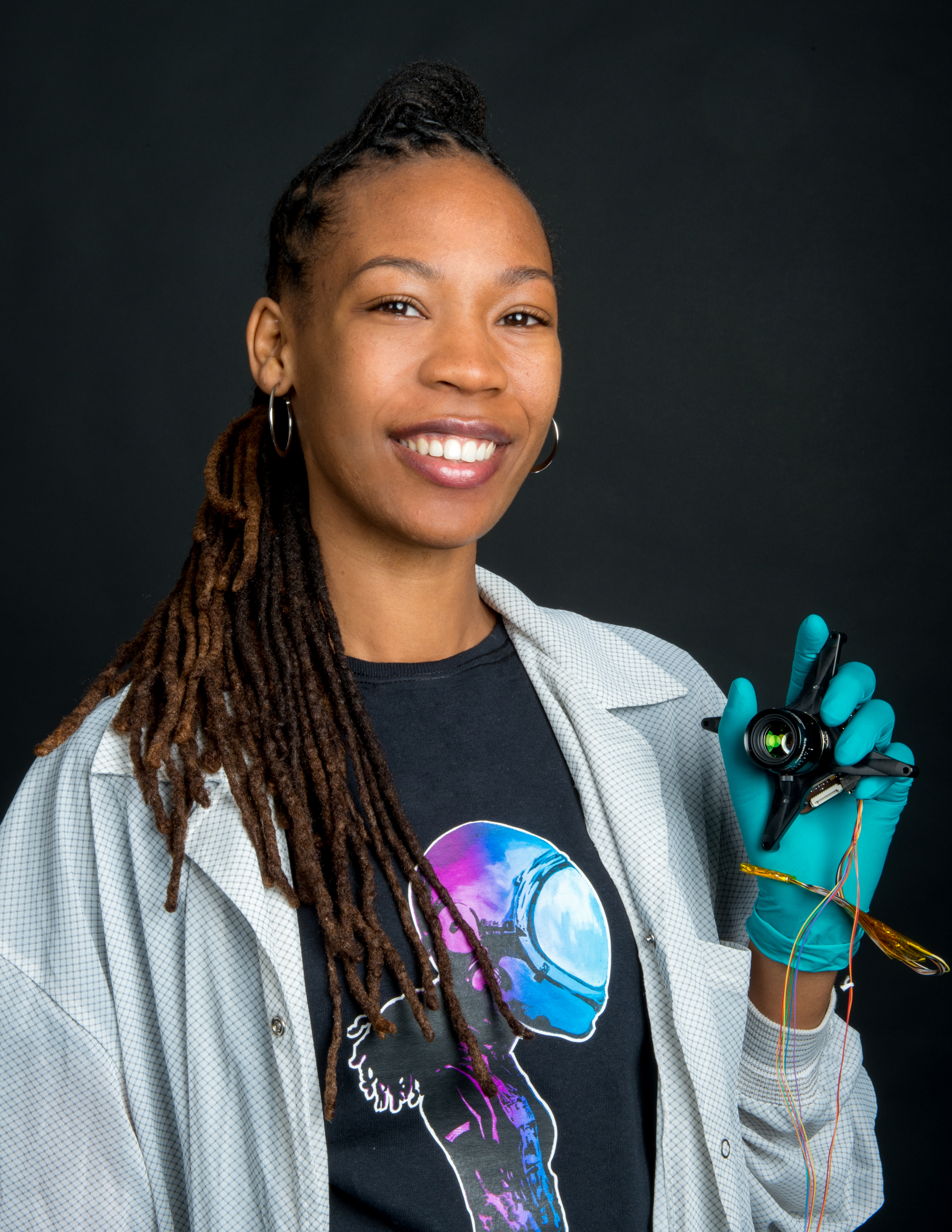
- Thompson with a CubeSat camera, 2017
- Born: Sabrina Nicole Thompson; April 9, 1985 (age 41); Roosevelt, New York, US
- Education: SUNY Stony Brook (BS); Georgia Tech (MS)
- Scientific career
- Workplaces: NASA Goddard Space Flight Center (2010–present)

Sabrina Nicole Thompson (born April 9, 1985) is an American aerospace engineer. As a Flight Dynamics Lead Analyst at the NASA Goddard Space Flight Center in Maryland, Thompson has developed orbits and trajectories for various NASA missions and mission concepts. She founded a Baltimore-based fashion brand, Girl in Space Club, which garnered press coverage in 2022 on its projects to develop flight suits and space suits for female astronauts.

== Early life and education ==
Sabrina Nicole Thompson was born on April 9, 1985, in Roosevelt, New York. Thompson was raised in Roosevelt and attended Roosevelt Public Schools from pre-kindergarten through high school. Her mother was a nurse and her father was a charter bus driver; she remembers her parents and grandmother inspired an "I-can-do-anything attitude" in her growing up. A player on the girls' varsity basketball team in high school, Thompson admired the athletes Cynthia Cooper, Teresa Edwards, and Teresa Weatherspoon and desired to become an artist or basketball player when she became older. She did not know what engineers were until her final year in high school. Later, she remarked that although her school district "didn't have the resources like the other schools on Long Island, I learned a lot. My teachers would do everything they could to get me harder work just to prepare me and help me." By the end of high school, Thompson chose to study engineering at university, after her art teacher recommended she study the subject since she excelled in math and science.

Thompson graduated from high school as co-valedictorian of her class in 2003 and chose to attend the State University of New York at Stony Brook to study mechanical engineering. During her undergraduate studies from 2003 to 2007, she completed summer internships at the American Honda Motor Co., Brookhaven National Laboratory, and a local product design firm. From 2007 to 2009, she attended the Georgia Institute of Technology for a master's degree in aerospace engineering and during this time interned at NASA Glenn Research Center in Ohio.

== Career ==
Thompson speaking on her role as a safety engineer in NASA Goddard's Occupational, Safety and Health Division, 2011

In 2010, Thompson was hired as a safety engineer at NASA Goddard Space Flight Center, in Greenbelt, Maryland, and worked in the facility's Occupational Safety and Health Division. She first met her mentor Piers Sellers, a NASA meteorologist and astronaut, during a leadership development program at NASA Goddard, and he would later inspire her to study atmospheric physics. She later moved to the Navigation and Mission Design Branch at NASA Goddard and worked as a Navigation & Mission Design Engineer. In this position, she worked on trajectories, orbit analysis, and mission design for spaceflight missions using CubeSats; research and development on using CubeSats for deep space missions; and flight dynamics of satellites in the Magnetospheric Multiscale Mission. She later earned a second graduate degree from the University of Maryland, Baltimore County (UMBC) and has pursued a PhD in atmospheric physics at the institution since 2017.

With UMBC professor Vanderlei Martins, Thompson worked on the Hyper-Angular Rainbow Polarimeter (HARP) CubeSat that launched from the International Space Station in 2020. HARP2, a copy of HARP with updated instrumentation, is set to be launched on the NASA satellite Plankton, Aerosol, Cloud, ocean Ecosystem (PACE) by December 2023 at the earliest. In 2021 and 2022, it was reported that Thompson was developing "swarms" of small satellites that can communicate with one another and obtain data on weather patterns at varied times and points of observation.

Thompson has spoken with students at educational institutions for the occasions of Black History Month and Engineers Week, recruited for her employer at colleges, and spoken at events which aim to educate youth about the fields of science, technology, engineering, and mathematics (STEM). She was vice president of the local Greenbelt Space Chapter of the National Society of Black Engineers in her initial years at NASA Goddard.

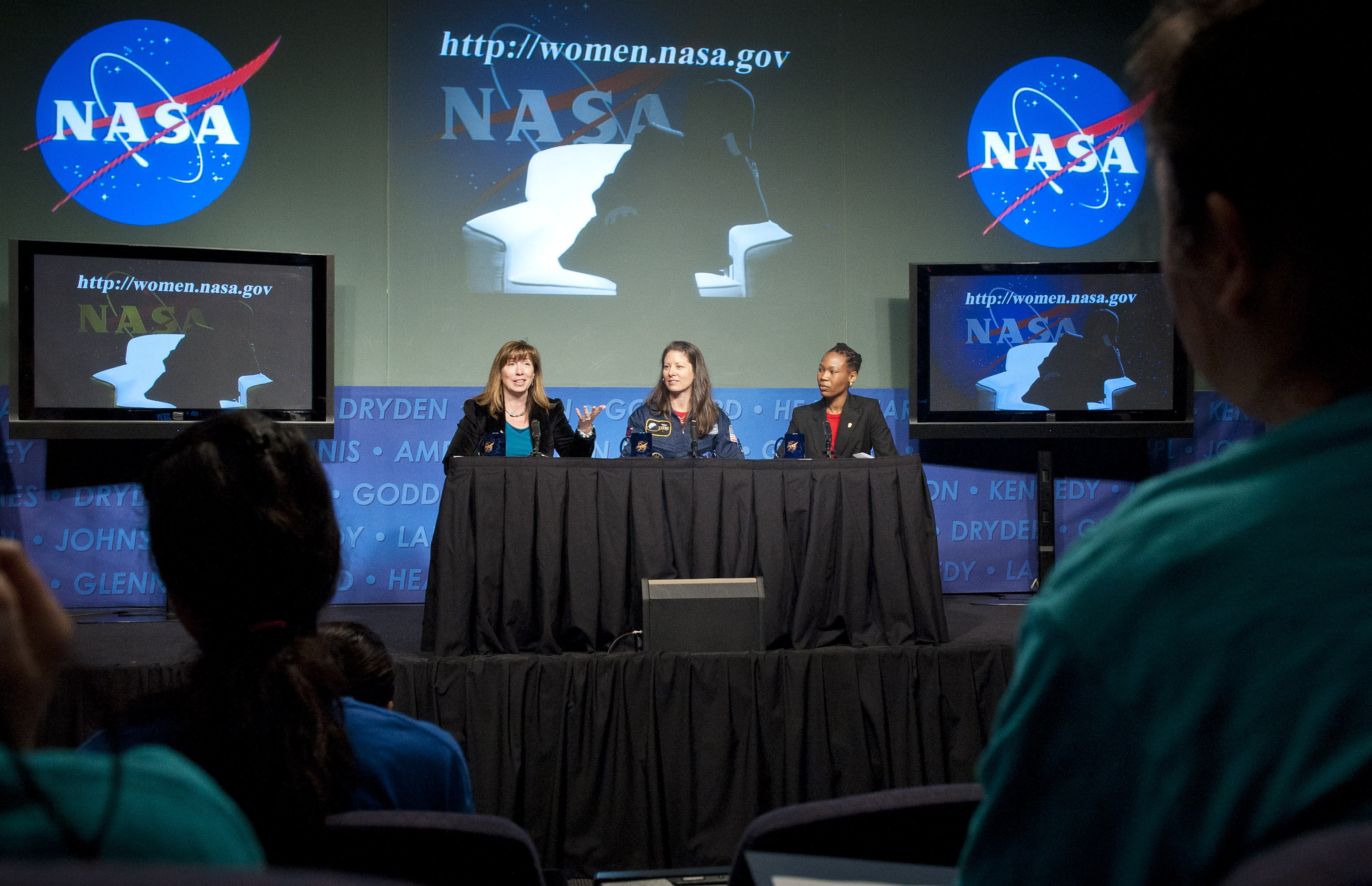
NASA Deputy Administrator Lori Garver (left at table), astronaut Tracy Caldwell Dyson (center), and Sabrina Thompson speaking at NASA Headquarters for Women's History Month, 2011

Thompson told Women's Wear Daily in 2022 that she had applied to the NASA astronaut program two times, including once in 2020, and that she plans to reapply in 2024.

The game studio Neon, founded in 2020, worked with Thompson to check the accuracy of technical language used in their blockchain game Shrapnel.

== Girl in Space Club ==
In 2018, Thompson created a direct-to-consumer streetwear brand named Girl in Space Club. She founded the fashion brand with the aim of making STEM "fun and fashionable", as she felt the "artist inside of me was internally starving" despite being satisfied with her career. The brand began to be profitable in 2020 through online and pop-up sales and its products in 2022 included jean jackets, T-shirts, and digital prints.

In 2022, its projects to design a flight suit and a pressurized space suit for female astronauts were featured by Women's Wear Daily and CNBC. That year Thompson said the space suit was in the "research and design phase" and that she was in the "early stages" of meeting with collaborators and seeking investors and grants for funding. She plans to make the flight suit available for purchase for $600.

The Girl in Space Club hosts workshops for youth in Baltimore which combine STEM topics with fashion.
