= Lori Mann Bruce =

American academic administrator

7th Chancellor of the University of Tennessee at Chattanooga
- Incumbent
- Assumed office 2025
- Preceded by: Steve Angle

Personal details
- Born: Lincoln County, Tennessee
- Education: University of Alabama in Huntsville (BS; Georgia Tech (MS); University of Alabama in Huntsville (PhD)

Lori Mann Bruce is the seventh Chancellor of the University of Tennessee at Chattanooga. She assumed this position in June, 2025. Prior to her move to Chattanooga, she served as Provost and Vice President for Academic Affairs and Professor of Electrical and Computer Engineering at Tennessee Technological University. As the Provost, she provided leadership to and oversight of eight colleges and schools, offering bachelors, masters, and doctoral programs. Before joining Tennessee Tech University, Bruce served as Associate Vice President for Academic Affairs and Dean of the Graduate School at Mississippi State University. While at Mississippi State University, Bruce was awarded the university's highest academic honor, being named a William L. Giles Distinguished Professor. As a faculty member in electrical and computer engineering, she has served as the Principal Investigator or Co-PI on more than 20 funded research grants and contracts, totaling approximately $20 million from federal agencies. Through her research in the areas of hyperspectral remote sensing, pattern recognition, automated target recognition, and precision agriculture, Bruce has served as major professor or graduate committee member for approximately 75 Masters and PhD students and has over 130 refereed publications.
