= Michel G. Malti =

American electrical engineer

Michel George Malti
- Born: November 7, 1895; Deir el Qamar, Ottoman Empire (modern-day Lebanon)
- Died: May 1978 (aged 82); Miami, Florida, U.S.
- Education: Syrian Protestant College, Georgia Tech, Cornell University
- Known for: Circuit analysis, dynamo balancing, 3D modeling of eddy currents
- Awards: IEEE Fellow

Michel George Malti (November 7, 1895 – May 1978) was an American electrical engineer, known for his work in circuit analysis. He was born in Deir el Qamar, in modern-day Lebanon and died in Miami, Florida. He graduated from the Syrian Protestant college (1915) and from Georgia Tech (1922), before joining Cornell University as an instructor and student, earning a M.Sc. (1924) and Ph.D. (1927), all degrees in electrical engineering.

He continued to serve as research assistant and faculty member in civil engineering and as a professor in electrical engineering until his retirement (1962), spending sabbaticals at the University of Puerto Rico (1947) and the University of Roorkee in India (1955–57). In 1939 Malti and Fritz Herzog solved an important electric power problem on balancing dynamos, which had remained unsolved since the days of Michael Faraday a century before. He later supervised research on 3D-modeling of Eddy currents. Malti was an IEEE Fellow.

== Works ==
- Circuit analysis (Wiley, 1930). Translated into Russian.
