= Candace Victoria Mitchell =

American computer scientist and businessperson (born 1987)

- Born: Candace Victoria Mitchell; November 13, 1987; Stone Mountain, Georgia
- Education: Georgia Tech
- Occupation: Business executive
- Years active: 2012- present
- Known for: Hair care and technology
- Title: Founder and CEO at Myavana
- Website: https://www.myavana.com/

Candace Victoria Mitchell (born 13 November 1987), is an American computer scientist, entrepreneur, and author. She is the co-founder and CEO of Myavana, a beauty technology company that uses AI for personalized hair care solutions. Mitchell has been recognized on Forbes 30 Under 30 (2016) and Georgia Tech’s Top 40 Under 40 Alumni list (2020).

== Early life and education ==
Mitchell grew up in Stone Mountain, Georgia (US), and attended Stephenson High School before enrolling at the Georgia Institute of Technology. She graduated in 2011 with a Bachelor of Science in Computer Science, specializing in Media and People. While at Georgia Tech, she participated in the InVenture Prize competition. In 2023, she was awarded the Rising Star Awards from the university.

== Career ==
After graduation, she worked as a data analyst and project manager at PepsiCo, Inc for a year until June 2012. In 2012, Mitchell co-founded Techturized, Inc., the parent company of Myavana, with a colleague from college.

in 2026 Mitchell led a program designed to link Atlanta businesses with people attending World Cup soccer events in Atlanta, Georgia.

== Lawsuit ==
As of May 2026, Myavana (Techturized Inc.) is facing a lawsuit from an investor (Resilent Ventures) regarding missed payments and contractual breaches.

== Views ==
Speaking to Inc. magazine during the 2020 racial justice protests, Mitchell described the period as “psychologically tough” and said the underfunding of Black founders stems from systemic racism rather than differences in creativity or potential. Mitchell described the protests as a pivotal moment in addressing racial inequality and encouraged open discussion and support for equity.
