= Mike Levy (businessman) =

American businessman

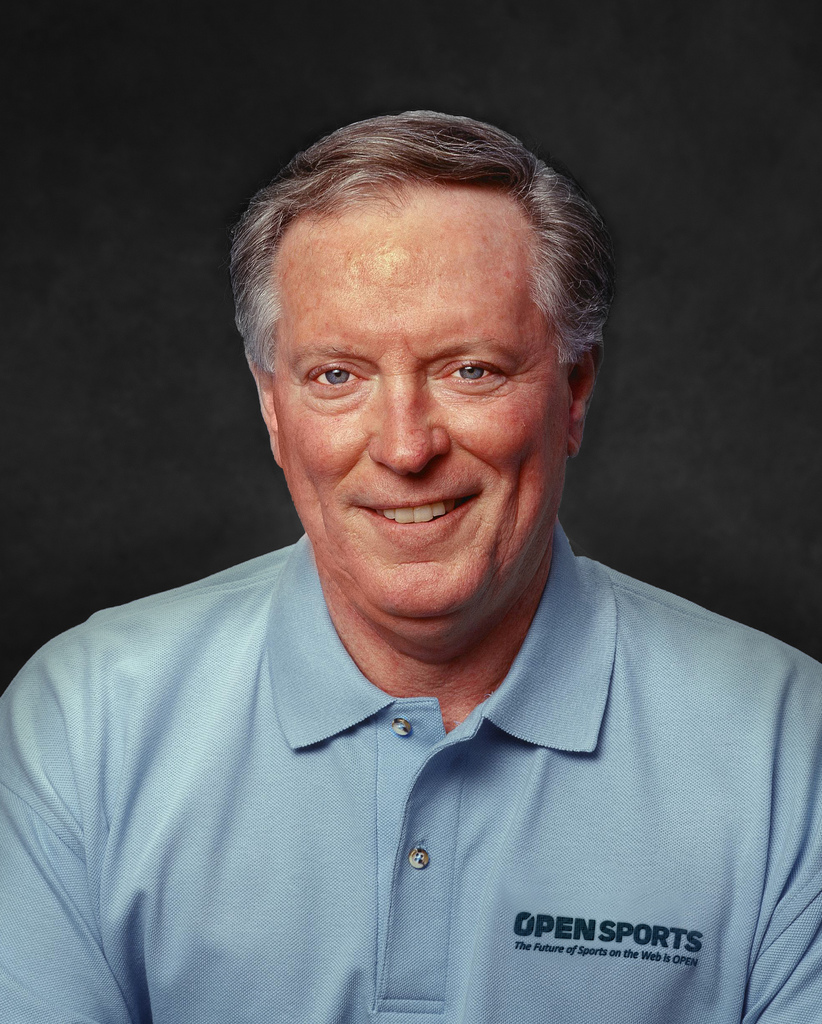
- Born: Gainesville, FL
- Occupation: entrepreneur
- Known for: Founder and CEO of Maxxpoint Corp

Mike Levy is an internet entrepreneur and the current chairman and CEO of Maxxpoint Corporation. Prior to Maxxpoint Mr. Levy was Founder and CEO of OPEN Sports. a new edge Sports Internet Company. Prior to OPEN Sports, Levy was the founder and former president, chairman and CEO of SportsLine.com, Inc., a leading Internet sports media company and publisher of CBS SportsLine, NFL.com, PGA Tour.com and NCAASports.com.

== Career ==
Mike Levy is the founder and CEO of Maxxpoint Corp. a consulting company specializing in high tech startups. Prior to launching Maxxpoint, Mr. Levy was the Founder and CEO of SportsLine, Inc., a leading sports media company and publisher of CBS SportsLine.com, NFL.com, PGA Tour.com and NCAA Sports.com. Mike Levy founded Sportsline in February, 1994. Sportsline was listed on NASDAQ from November, 1997 through December, 2004 when it was acquired by CBS.

At Sportsline, Levy forged alliances with CBS Sports, AOL, the NFL, the NBA, MLB, the PGA Tour, the NCAA, various players' associations and many superstar athletes including Tiger Woods, Michael Jordan, Shaquille O'Neal, Joe Namath, John Elway, Jerry Rice, Mike Schmidt and Wayne Gretzky.

Levy took Sportsline public in 1997 raising $32 million. In 1998, Sportsline raised $150 million in a secondary offering and in 1999 raised $150 million in a convertible bond offering.

From 1978 through 1993, Levy was CEO of Lexicon Corporation, a company he co-founded to develop and market the world's first electronic language translator. Under Levy, Lexicon went on to develop data communications terminals for the Department of Defense and Fortune 500 clients, and financial transaction terminals for major credit card issuers, banks and large retailers. Sports-Tech International, Inc., a Lexicon subsidiary developed the video analysis systems which were used by NFL and NBA teams, and over 150 collegiate sports programs.

From 1969 through 1977 Levy held engineering design and management positions with Racal Datacom and Harris Corporation. Levy holds six patents for innovative high-tech products and received his Bachelor of Electrical Engineering degree from Georgia Tech in 1969.

== Awards ==
Levy was selected as one of The Sporting News "100 most powerful people in sports" for three consecutive years (1999–2001). In 1999, he was given the "Annual Achievement in Technology and New Media Award" by UJA Federation of New York. In 1998, Levy was inducted by Georgia Tech's College of Engineering into the Academy of Distinguished Alumni. In 1997, Levy received the "Florida Entrepreneur of the Year Award" sponsored by Ernst & Young and the "1997 Interactive Entrepreneur Award" by the Interactive Services Association.
