= David Frakes =

American engineer, professor, and entrepreneur

- Born: 1976 (age 49–50); Columbia, Missouri
- Occupations: Engineer, professor, and entrepreneur.

Academic background
- Education: BS in electrical engineering MS in mechanical engineering MS in electrical engineering PhD in bioengineering.
- Alma mater: Georgia Institute of Technology

David Harold Frakes (born 1976) is an American engineer, professor, and entrepreneur. He is a Distinguished Faculty Fellow in biomedical engineering at the Georgia Institute of Technology. He is also an adjunct professor of radiology at Mayo Clinic. Frakes is best known for pioneering simulation-based planning for brain surgeries and 3D printing-based planning for heart surgeries.

He has worked on computer vision as a Technical Program Lead at Google and on the camera software at Apple, where he focused on the iPhone 11 family of products.

== Early life and education ==
Frakes was born in Columbia, Missouri, in 1976. He grew up in Rockford, Illinois, and went to Guilford High School. He attended the Georgia Institute of Technology where he earned four degrees in engineering; BS in electrical engineering, MS in mechanical engineering, MS in electrical engineering, and PhD in bioengineering. He also completed a postdoctoral fellowship in biomedical engineering at Georgia Tech and Emory University.

Frakes was a two-sport letterman at Georgia Tech as a placekicker for the football team and a pole vaulter for the track and field team. He was leading scorer for the 1997 Yellow Jackets football team that won the Carquest Bowl and ranked 25th in the country. Frakes also set the record for the longest field goal in Georgia Tech history under current NCAA rules (53 yards). He signed as a free agent with the Washington Redskins in 1998 and went to preseason camps but did not make the regular season team. Frakes returned to Georgia Tech to coach kickers on the 1998 Yellow Jackets football team that shared the ACC Championship and finished 8th in the country.

== Career ==
Frakes started several companies and worked in computational finance before returning to academia in 2008. He joined the faculty at Arizona State University (ASU) as a jointly appointed professor in the School of Biological and Health Systems Engineering and the School of Electrical, Computer, and Energy Engineering. There he led the Image Processing Applications Laboratory, which covered a range of topics including image and video processing, computer vision, cardiovascular fluid mechanics, and medical devices. Frakes laboratory created pioneering technology for simulating the deployment of endovascular devices into blood vessels in the brain. He was awarded the National Science Foundation CAREER Award and the World Technology Network Award in Health and Medicine for that work, which served as the basis for the company EndoVantage that Frakes cofounded.

Frakes was also among the first to apply 3D printing to planning congenital heart defect repairs, and was recognized as Innovator of the Year in the state of Arizona for that work. Frakes held the Fulton Entrepreneurial Professor Chair at ASU until moving to Georgia Tech in 2020. There he is a Distinguished Faculty Fellow, a jointly appointed associate professor in the Wallace H. Coulter Department of Biomedical Engineering and the School of Electrical and Computer Engineering, and principal investigator of the Georgia Tech Applied Vision Lab. Frakes also maintains adjunct professor appointments at ASU and Mayo Clinic.

=== Industry career ===
In 2015, Frakes went on sabbatical from ASU and joined the Advanced Technologies and Projects group at Google as a Technical Program Lead. He led several different programs there before transitioning one to the Daydream organization, where Frakes led research behind Google's visual search engine product, Lens. In 2019, Frakes left Google to become Lead of Camera Software at Apple where he worked primarily on computational photography. Frakes held that role through launch of the iPhone 11 family of products. He also continued to serve as Chief Science Officer for EndoVantage until the company was acquired by RapidAI in 2020.

== Awards and honors ==
- 2010 - Rosann Donato Chair of Research – The Brain Aneurysm Foundation
- 2011 - IEEE Phoenix Section Outstanding Faculty Award
- 2012 - National Science Foundation CAREER Award
- 2014 - World Technology Network Award – Health and Medicine Category
- 2014 - State of Arizona Innovator of the Year
- 2017 - IEEE Phoenix Section Engineer of the Year

== Selected publications ==
- Frakes D, Pekkan K, Dasi LP, Kitajima HD, Yoganathan AP, Smith MJT. A New Adaptive Method for Registration-Based Medical Image Interpolation. IEEE Transactions on Medical Imaging. vol 27(3), pp 370–7, Mar 2008.
- Babiker M, Gonzalez F, Ryan J, Albuquerque F, Collins D, Elvikis A, Frakes D. Influence of Stent Configuration on Cerebral Aneurysm Fluid Dynamics. Journal of Biomechanics. vol 45(3), pp 440–7, Feb 2012.
- Zwart C, Frakes D. Segment Adaptive Gradient Angle Interpolation. IEEE Transactions on Image Processing. vol 22(8), pp 2960–9, Aug 2013.
- Babiker M, Gonzalez L, Chong B, Cheema S, Frakes D. Finite Element Modeling of Embolic Coil Deployment: Multifactor Characterization of Treatment Effects on Cerebral Aneurysm Hemodynamics. Journal of Biomechanics. vol 46(16), pp 2809–16, Nov 2013.
- Chaudhury R, Herrmann M, Frakes D, Adrian R. Length and Time for Development of Laminar Flow in Tubes Following a Step Increase of Volume Flux. Experiments in Fluids. vol 56(22), pp 1–10, Jan 2015.
- Nair P, Chong B, Indahlastari A, Ryan J, Workman C, Babiker H, Farsani H, Baccin C, Frakes D. Hemodynamic Characterization of Geometric Cerebral Aneurysm Templates Treated with Embolic Coils. Journal of Biomechanical Engineering. vol 138(2), Jan 2016.
- Ryan J, Plasencia J, Richardson R, Velez D, Nigro J, Pophal S, Frakes D. 3D Printing for Congenital Heart Disease: A Single Site's Initial Three-Year Experience. 3D Printing in Medicine. vol 4(10), Nov 2018.
- Plasencia J, Kamarianakis Y, Ryan J, Karamlou T, Park S, Nigro J, Frakes D, Pophal S, Zangwill S. Alternative Methods for Virtual Heart Transplant – Size Matching for Pediatric Heart Transplantation with and without Donor Medical Images Available. Journal of Pediatric Transplantation. vol 22(8), Dec 2018.
- Farsani H, Herrmann M, Chong B, Frakes D. A New Method for Simulating Embolic Coils as Heterogeneous Porous Media. Cardiovascular Engineering and Technology. vol 10(1), Mar 2019.
- Chong B, Bendok B, Krishna C, Sattur M, Brown B, Tawk R, Miller D, Rangel-Castilla L, Babiker H, Frakes D, Theiler A, Cloft H, Kallmes D, Lanzino G. A Multi-Center Pilot Study on the Clinical Utility of Computational Modeling for Flow Diverter Treatment Planning. American Journal of Neuroradiology. accepted: Aug 2019.
