= Yvonne Pendleton =

American astrophysicist

- Born: 1957 (age 68–69); Key West, Florida
- Education: Georgia Tech, Stanford University, University of California, Santa Cruz
- Spouse: Dale Cruikshank
- Awards: One of the top 100 most influential women in Silicon Valley by the San Jose Business Journal, Outstanding Leadership Medal, and the Presidential Rank Award for Meritorious Executive
- Scientific career
- Fields: Astrophysicist
- Institutions: NASA
- Thesis: Analysis of Dust Grain Properties in Two Star Forming Regions Through Comparison of Theoretical Models to Observations
- Doctoral advisors: David Rank, Michael Werner, and Alexander Tielens

Yvonne Jean Pendleton is an American astrophysicist and is currently the Chief Scientist of NASA's Solar System Exploration Research Virtual Institute (SSERVI) at Ames Research Center. Pendleton earned degrees from Georgia Tech, Stanford University, and the University of California, Santa Cruz and was hired by NASA as a civil servant in 1979. She served as a research scientist in the Space Science and Astrobiology Division at NASA Ames Research Center (ARC) until 2007, including as Division Chief from 2006 to 2007. In 2007 she was promoted to the Senior Executive Service, the highest level of civil service within the federal government, and throughout her career has served in high-level leadership positions at both NASA's ARC (in California) and headquarters (in Washington, D.C.). Her scientific research has investigated the origin and evolution of organic material in our galaxy and is currently focused on the composition of the solar nebula from which the Solar System formed. She is an elected fellow of the California Academy of Sciences, and asteroid 7165 Pendleton was named for her by the International Astronomical Union in honor of her research contributions.

== Early life ==
Pendleton grew up in Key West, Florida, the youngest of two children born to Willie G. Pendleton and Emilia Claudia Pendleton. Yvonne has wanted to be a part of NASA since she was 10 years old when she could sometimes watch Apollo rockets from her back yard just after they would launch from the Kennedy Space Center. Her older sister, Olga Pendleton Herman (Ph.D. in Statistics), played an important role in Yvonne's career path, as she served as her role model to stay in school and get her Ph.D.

== Personal life ==
Pendleton is married to a planetary astronomer, Dale Cruikshank. They married in 1996, joining a total of five children from previous marriages. Pendleton and Cruikshank merged not only their families, but also their interests in the origin and composition of primitive Solar System objects, and have published research papers together. They are also raising a golden retriever therapy dog, Toby, to go into schools and hospitals. Pendleton has taken Toby, whose American Kennel Club registered name is “Cosmic Rover”, to work with her to complete his socialization training, and he has become the institute's mascot. In her spare time, Yvonne is an avid scuba diver, having earned her open water certification in 1985. Entering the professional dive industry in 2015, she became a divemaster, and then an Assistant Instructor (2018) through the PADI dive association. Since 2015, she has assisted several scuba classes through a local dive shop in northern California.

== Education ==
Pendleton earned her Bachelor of Aerospace Engineering degree from Georgia Tech in 1979. In her senior year at Georgia Tech, NASA Ames Research Center recruited her to work at ARC in California, offering to pay for her continued education while working part-time at ARC, if she could be accepted into a graduate-level engineering program at a local university. She applied to the Aeronautics and Astronautics engineering program at Stanford University, and once accepted, was hired as a civil servant at NASA ARC. While working part-time at ARC, she completed the master's degree program at Stanford University in 1981, after which she returned to full-time employment. In 1982 she applied for admission to the Astronomy and Astrophysics Department at the University of California, Santa Cruz, and upon acceptance, was awarded another NASA graduate study fellowship which enabled her to complete her PhD, “ Analysis of Dust Grain Properties in Two Star Forming Regions Through Comparison of Theoretical Models to Observations”, in 1987. Her thesis advisor was David Rank, and her advisors at NASA ARC were Michael Werner and Alexander Tielens.

== Career ==
Pendleton's career path was influenced by the academic environment of the Planetary Systems Branch of the Space Science and Astrobiology Division at NASA's Ames Research Center, especially in the 1980s. The role NASA scientists played in the Voyager and Pioneer missions enabled Pendleton to meet scientists from many universities and other NASA centers when they would come to Ames to give seminars or meet with colleagues. One, in particular, Carl Sagan, had a profound effect on her career, stemming from their meetings in those formative years soon after finishing her Ph.D. He encouraged her, as he did many young people, by taking the time to write her the occasional letter commenting on the importance he saw in a recent paper she had published. On one occasion when he was attending a conference held at Ames, at which she gave a talk, he encouraged her to pursue her investigations into the organic component of the interstellar medium, work that was in the very earliest stages at that time. Many of her colleagues in the Space Science Division were similarly supportive of her work over the next two decades, and her career developed a strong national and international reputation as she continued her observational work at major observatories and published more than 80 scientific papers. From 1994 to 2006, she was the Principal Investigator of high-profile observational programs, including the Hubble Space Telescope, the Spitzer Space Telescope, the Kuiper Airborne Observatory and ground-based observatories around the world.

In 2006, she was asked to become Chief of the same division in which her career had started in 1979. Appointed Chief of the Space Science and Astrobiology Division at NASA Ames Research Center in 2006, she led a scientific and technical staff of 160 people. In January 2007, she was selected to become a member of the Senior Executive Service (SES).

In March 2007, Pendleton was appointed Senior Advisor for the Research and Analysis programs in the Science Mission Directorate at NASA Headquarters. She and her husband, Dale Cruikshank, moved to Washington, DC, where she provided independent assessments and guidance to the Associate Administrator of the Science Mission Directorate concerning NASA's science research programs (March 2007 through May 2008). During that time, Pendleton and her team increased scientific productivity across the nation as the time required to evaluate and award research grants was significantly reduced. In January 2008, she was given the additional responsibility for oversight of the Education and Public Outreach (EPO) of NASA's Science Mission Directorate and led a team that managed the nearly 50 million dollar investment made in EPO activities, including those from NASA's science missions.

At the completion of her detail to NASA Headquarters, Pendleton returned to NASA ARC (June 2008) and was appointed Deputy Associate Director of NASA Ames Research Center. In this position within the Center Director's office, she provided guidance and direction to collaborative scientific and technical efforts and served as the first academic dean of students for the several hundred students on the Ames campus each summer.

=== NASA Ames Research Center ===
In July 2010, the Ames Research Center Director appointed Pendleton to be the first director of the NASA Lunar Science Institute (NLSI), a virtual institute supporting scientists across the nation, managed by a central office at NASA ARC. In 2013, the scope of NASA's human exploration program expanded to focus on near-Earth asteroids, resulting in an expansion of the portfolio the virtual institute covered, to include not only the Moon but also the moons of Mars and the near-Earth asteroids. This required the creation of a new institute, the Solar System Exploration Research Virtual Institute (SSERVI) and Pendleton was named its first director. She served in that capacity for eight years, but in 2018 requested to return to full-time astronomical research as the promise of the James Webb Space Telescope offers such tantalizing opportunities to address the questions in her original line of research. Having won the Presidential Rank Award for Meritorious Executive in 2017, the NASA Outstanding Leadership Medal in 2015, and earning the San Jose Business Journal Top 100 Most Influential Women in Silicon Valley award in 2014, Pendleton's success as an executive leader was well established, but so too was her scientific research career. Her request was granted by NASA with the caveat that she remain a part of the institute she had helped to create, as the first Chief Scientist of the institute. In this newly developed role, she provides technical guidance for the institute, while pursuing her independent astronomical research in support of NASA's mission to explore our origins.

== Publications ==
Pendleton has authored more than 80 publications throughout her career.

== Awards and recognition ==
Pendleton has received numerous awards for her scientific research and her leadership roles at NASA. In addition to becoming the first woman chief of the Space Science and Astrobiology Division at NASA Ames Research Center, she was also the first dean of students at NASA ARC and the first chief scientist of the virtual institute that she led as director for 8 years. The International Astronomical Society named Asteroid 7165 Pendleton after her contributions to the study of organic material in space in 1997. She was elected, in 2003, a fellow of the California Academy of Sciences. She was competitively selected for the Federal Government Senior Executive Service in 2007. In 2014, she was named one of the top 100 most influential women in Silicon Valley by the San Jose Business Journal. In 2015, she was awarded one of NASA's highest awards, the Outstanding Leadership Medal. In 2017, she was honored with the Presidential Rank Award for Meritorious Executive by the federal government. She was also competitively selected for Federal Government Senior Executive Service from 2007 to now.
