= George Gordon Crawford =

American industrialist (1869–1936)

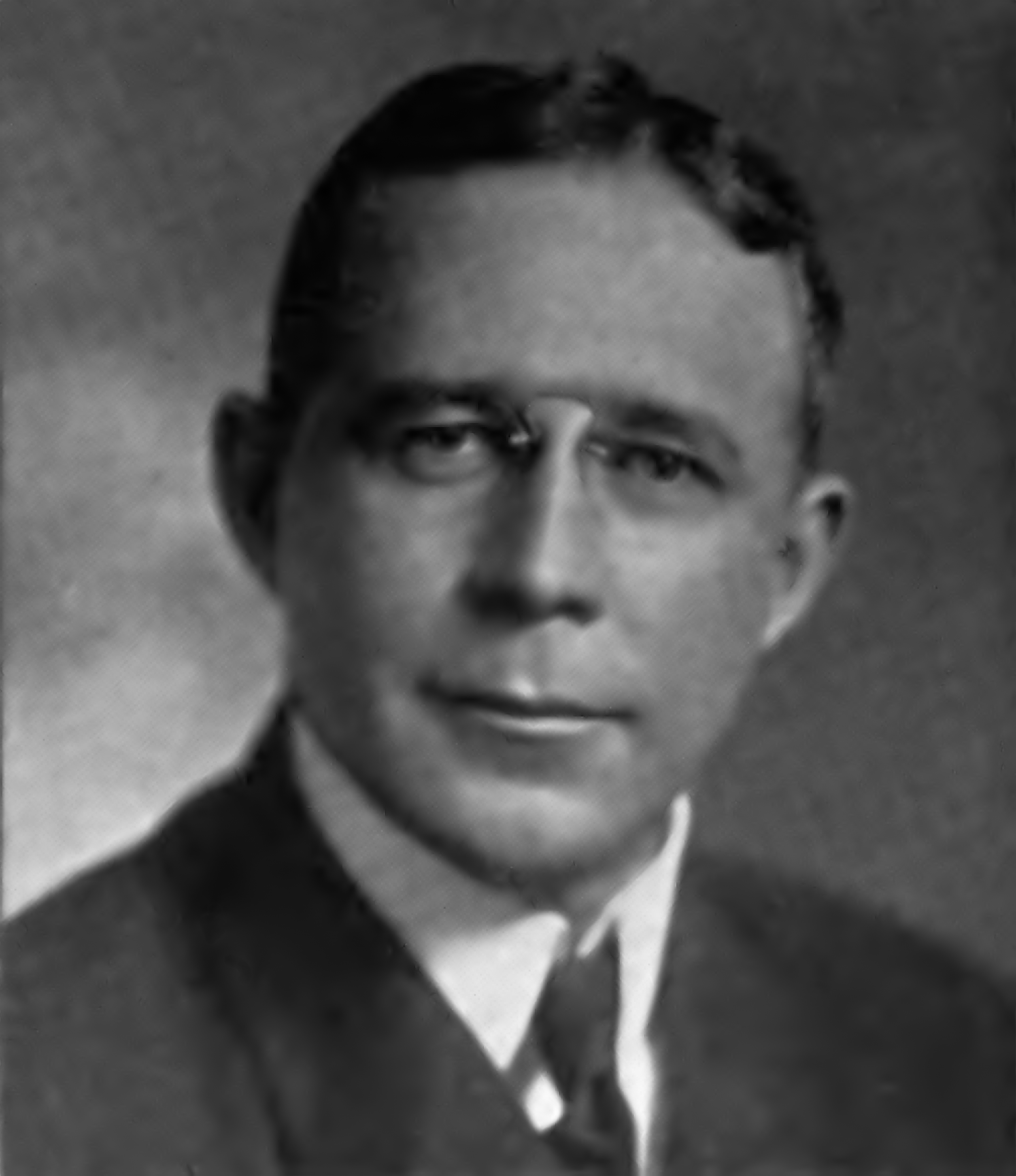
- Born: August 24, 1869; Madison, Georgia
- Died: March 20, 1936 (aged 66); Fairfield, Alabama
- Resting place: Elmwood Cemetery; Birmingham, Alabama
- Education: Georgia Tech
- Known for: Industrialist and Georgia Tech's second graduate

George Gordon Crawford (August 24, 1869 – March 20, 1936) was an American industrialist.

== Early life and education ==
Crawford was born to George Gilmore and Margaret Reed Howard Crawford on August 24, 1869, and raised on a plantation in Madison, Georgia. He was the second graduate of the Georgia Institute of Technology; the 1890 graduating class consisted of two people, himself and Henry L. Smith; their graduation order was decided by the flip of a coin. Crawford took a graduate course in chemistry from the University of Tübingen in Tübingen, Baden-Württemberg, Germany from 1891 to 1892.

== Career ==
In 1907, he became the president of the Tennessee Coal, Iron and Railroad Company in Birmingham, Alabama, during which time he was named "Alabama's First Citizen". He became president of the Jones and Laughlin Steel Company in Pittsburgh, Pennsylvania, in 1930.

== Memberships and legacy ==
Crawford received an honorary doctorate from Georgia Tech in 1931, and was a member of the Georgia Tech Board of Trustees until its replacement by the Georgia Board of Regents in 1932. He is listed in the University of Alabama Culverhouse College of Commerce's Alabama Business Hall of Fame. He was a member of the Alpha Tau Omega fraternity.
