= Jon C. Kreitz =

U.S. Navy rear admiral (born 1963)

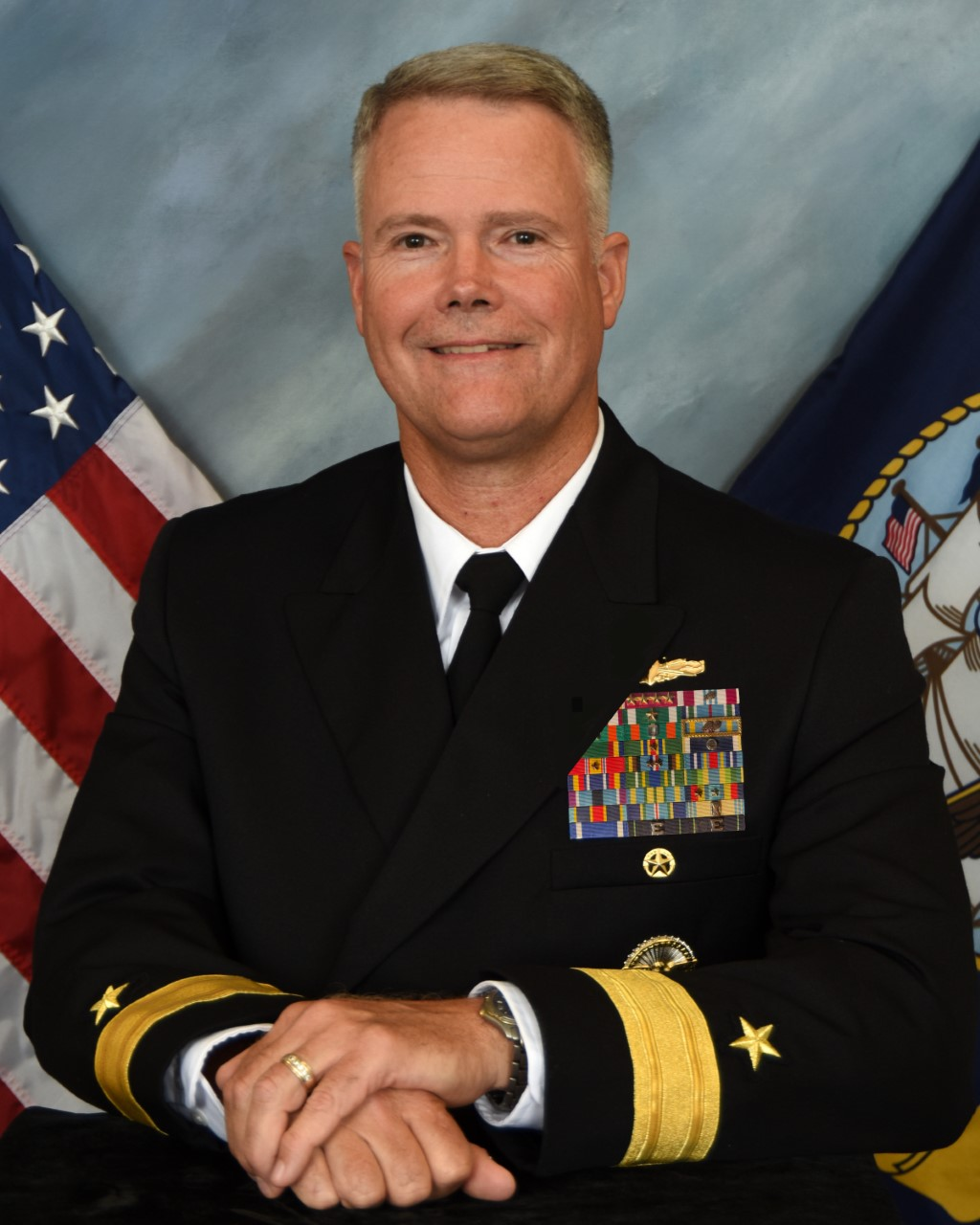

Jon Christopher Kreitz (born December 18, 1963) is a retired United States Navy rear admiral and former deputy director of the Defense POW/MIA Accounting Agency. He is an independent director on the board of directors of the United States Equestrian Federation (USEF) and a member of the board of directors and the executive committee of the Surface Navy Association (SNA).

== Biography ==
A native of Orange County, California, Rear Adm. Jon Kreitz attended Capistrano Valley High School where he was known by his middle name Chris. Immediately upon graduating in 1982, he enlisted in the U.S. Navy in May 1982 as a Machinist’s Mate. After a tour on board the USS Nassau (LHA 4), he earned a Bachelor of Science degree in Applied Physics and received a commission through the NROTC program at the Georgia Institute of Technology. He holds a Master of Science Degree in Physics from the Naval Postgraduate School in 1992 and a Master of Military Art and Science Degree in Strategy from the U.S. Army Command and General Staff College. He is a graduate of the National Defense University (NDU) CAPSTONE course for Flag and General Officers, and he was a Massachusetts Institute of Technology (MIT) Seminar XXI Foreign Affairs and National Security Policy Fellow.

Kreitz has also served at sea on the USS Bunker Hill (CG-52), USS Mitscher (DDG-57), and USS Enterprise (CVN-65) prior to commanding the USS Stephen W. Groves (FFG-29), where his crew interdicted nearly 20 metric tons of cocaine during two counter narco-terrorism operations deployments. He also commanded USS New York (LPD-21) for her maiden deployment, earning a Battle ‘E’ Award and the 2013 Atlantic Fleet Marjorie Sterrett Battleship Fund Award as the most battle ready ship in the Atlantic Fleet.

Ashore, he has served as a branch head and as the executive assistant to the director for manpower, personnel and administration at Headquarters, Commander in Chief, U.S. Pacific Command. He has served three tours on the staff of the Chief of Naval Operations (OPNAV), once as the strategy and requirements branch head for the director of Surface Warfare (OPNAV N86), and twice in the Office of the Chief of Navy Reserve (OPNAV N095) including duty as executive assistant to the Chief of Navy Reserve. He served as the chief of staff and senior military assistant to the assistant secretary of defense for reserve affairs and the assistant secretary of defense for manpower and reserve affairs. He also served as the Executive Assistant to the Assistant Secretary of the Navy for Manpower and Reserve Affairs.

Kreitz’ first flag officer tour was as the 66th president, Board of Inspection and Survey, where he was responsible for assessing the material readiness of the fleet. His final assignment was as the deputy director for operations of the Defense POW/MIA Accounting Agency where he led record increases in the return of Americans missing from past conflicts. He retired from the U.S. Navy in December 2019 after over 37 years of service.

His personal decorations include the Defense Superior Service Medal, Legion of Merit Medals, Defense Meritorious Service Medals, Meritorious Service Medals, Navy and Marine Corps Commendation Medals, as well as other individual, unit, and campaign awards.

He served as a Deputy Sheriff I (Extra Help) with the Orange County Sheriff-Coroner Department (OCSD) in California from July 1984 until February 1995.

He was nominated by President Donald Trump to be the assistant secretary of the Air Force for manpower and reserve affairs in September 2020. No action was taken on the nomination by the Senate Committee on Armed Services before the end of the Trump administration.

He has served as the president and chairman of the board of directors of Mission: POW-MIA since its founding in 2023. Additionally, he was appointed to the board of directors of Healing Through History in 2023.

He has been a member of the executive committee of the Surface Navy Association (SNA) since 2007 and was elected to the SNA board of directors in January 2022.

A life-long equestrian, he was elected to the board of directors of the United States Equestrian Federation (USEF) as an independent director in January 2021, and was elected to the USEF executive committee in 2022. He is a Federation Equestre Internationale (FEI) licensed Dressage Steward and a USEF licensed Dressage Technical Delegate, officiating at equestrian competitions across the United States and internationally.

He briefly served as the chief executive officer of the National League of POW/MIA Families in 2021 and served as a senior advisor to the National League of POW/MIA Families from December 2021 through December 2022.
