= James Henry Deese =

American NASA manager (1914–2001)

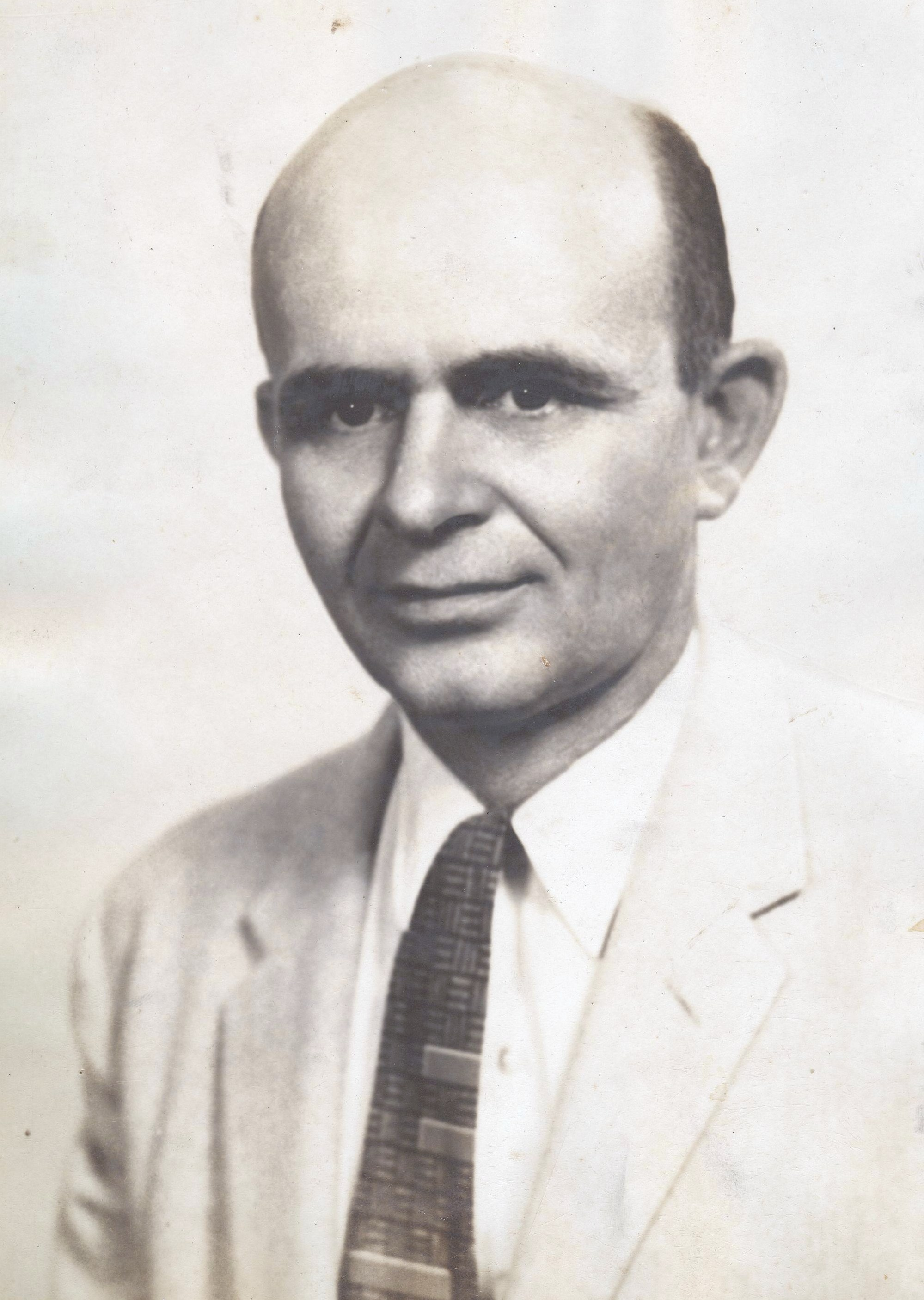
- James H. Deese
- Born: James Henry Deese; September 23, 1914; Graceville, Florida
- Died: August 11, 2001 (aged 86); Melbourne, Florida
- Occupations: NASA Administrator, Engineer, Surveyor
- Spouse: Mary Deese

James Henry Deese (September 23, 1914 – August 11, 2001) was an American NASA manager.

== Career ==
He was Chief of Facilities Design Branch, Kennedy Space Center from 1960 to 1964; Chief of the Advanced Studies Office of NASA Launch Operations Center from 1964 to 1966; Senior Research Administrator for the Future Studies Office at Kennedy Space Center from 1966 to 1973; and chaired the Nuclear and Radiologic Committee at Kennedy Space Center for six years.

== Early life ==
James Henry Deese was born on September 23, 1914, in Graceville, Florida to William Lawrence Deese and Maria Isabella Hand of North Carolina. Deese was cousin of American psychologist and academic James Deese. Deese attended Palmer Academy in DeFuniak Springs, Florida from 1920 to 1930. He attended Georgia Institute of Technology and the U.S. Naval Academy from 1931 to 1935, where he studied Electrical and Civil Engineering. He began work with the U.S. Government in 1935 with the Works Progress Administration as Project Information Specialist. In 1936 he joined Carrier Corporation as field project engineer installing first air conditioning in the U.S. Capital and the Federal Reserve Buildings. While in this capacity, he was contributing author of Carrier's First "Handbook of Modern Air Conditioning, Heating and Ventilation". In 1941, he transferred to Mobile, Alabama where he served as Construction Quartermaster at Brookley Field. After the outbreak of World War II, he was assigned on emergency basis to execute the overall design of Warner Robins AFB in Macon, Georgia. In late 1944, he transferred to Engine Research and Development Laboratories at Fort Belvoir, Virginia where he was Chief of Internal Combustion Engine Laboratory. He directed such developments as Free Stem Roto-Valves, Pressurizing Burners, and built and tested one of the first Aero Thermodynamic Jets (athoyds) in the United States. From 1949 to 1950, he was Chief of Building Utilities Research at Fort Belvoir, where he contributed to development of Prefabricated Arctic Structures and Facilities.

== Involvement in the space program ==
In 1950, by now married with children, he moved his family to Brevard County, Florida accepting an assignment as Chief Equipment Designer for the Joint Long Range Proving Ground at Patrick Air Force Base where he co-authored a master plan for Cape Canaveral, locating many of the major launch site facilities where they are today. His influence at the Cape spanned 35 years. He contributed to five major U.S. Space Programs including Redstone, Jupiter, Mercury, Apollo and Saturn. From 1951 to 1956, he directed the design and construction of the Missile Assembly and Launch Facilities at the Cape and technically directed material programs supporting REDSTONE, ATLAS, CENTAUR and other spacecraft projects as well as directing development of all cryogenic and high pressure production, storage and transfer systems at Cape Canaveral. In 1956 he accepted an assignment with Dr. Kurt Debus of the Army Ballistic Missile Agency-Missile Firing Laboratory for facilities development of the Jupiter Program. From 1960 to 1964 he was Chief, Facilities Design Branch of KSC Facilities Office where he directed, planned and supervised construction and operation of facilities for PERSHING, JUPITER, SATURN, POLARIS and NOVA launch vehicles. While in this position, he was the primary author on Ground Operations-Launching Sites and Space Ports in the first edition of the "Handbook of Astronautical Engineering' (1961) edited by Dr. Wernher von Braun. From 1964 to 1966 he was Chief, Advance Studies Office of NASA-Launch Operations Center Coordinating requirements and directing facility concept evaluation and special studies for Shuttle, Viking, Orbiting Space Telescopes and Earth Surveillance. From 1966 to 1973 He served as Senior Research Administrator for the Future Studies Office at KSC directing special investigations of problem areas earning international recognition as technical authority on liquid propellant explosions and analysis of low level wind behavior. He chaired the Nuclear and Radiologic Committee at KSC for six years.

== Community contributions ==
His community services included a significant contribution to the site location of Our Lady of Lourdes School and Melbourne Central Catholic High School, as well as serving as City Commissioner of Melbourne, Florida from 1966 to 1968.

== Life after NASA ==
After retirement from NASA, from 1975 to 1990, he owned and operated Coastal Land Surveys and Engineering in Melbourne, Florida, where he applied the latest technological developments to the arts of Professional Land Surveying and Professional Engineering.

Deese died peacefully at his home on August 11, 2001.
