= Gary C. Butler =

American chief executives

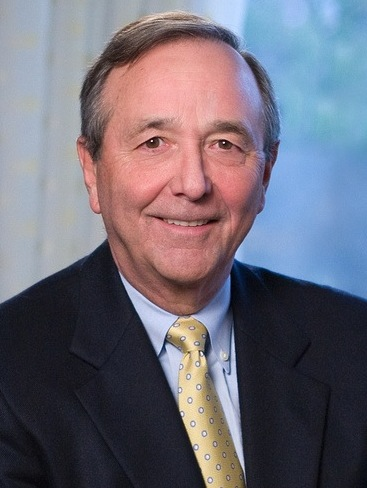
- Died: April 10, 2023; Sarasota, Florida
- Education: Georgia Institute of Technology; University of Georgia (MBA)

Gary C. Butler was the CEO and president of Automatic Data Processing. He held this position from August 2006 through November 2011, and had been with the company for 37 years. From 1990 to 1995, he served as group president for ADP's Dealer Services Group; and from 1995 to 1998 he served in the same capacity for ADP's Employer Services Group. Prior to assuming his role as CEO in 2006, Butler was president and chief operating officer of the company.

== Work at ADP ==
Butler oversaw investments in new service offerings that use state-of-the-art technologies, set a path of growth that included strategic acquisitions in the U.S. and abroad, and directed the company's rapid global expansion into more than 40 countries on five continents.

== Compensation ==
While CEO of Automatic Data Processing in 2008, Gary C. Butler earned a total compensation of $7,917,721, which included a base salary of $900,000, a cash bonus of $2,579,405, stocks granted of $1,951,688, options granted of $2,268,000, as well as $218,628 in other compensation.

== Recognition ==
Honors given to Butler include:

- Honored with the Pace University “Leadership and Service in Technology Award” in 2011

== Degrees and Professional Involvement ==
Butler received a bachelor of industrial engineering degree from the Georgia Institute of Technology in 1968 and an MBA from the University of Georgia in 1970. He served on the boards of ADP, Liberty Mutual Group, DeVry, Inc., CIT Group, Convergys Corporation and CareerBuilder. He is a past member of Business Roundtable and The Economic Club of New York.

== Personal Information ==
Butler was the father of two children. He was the senior trustee of the Gary C. Butler Charitable Family Foundation. On November 6, 2011, he was arrested for domestic charges, just days prior to his supposed planned retirement announcement from ADP. On August 13, 2012, the South Carolina Solicitor's office dismissed all criminal domestic charges against him. On April 10, 2023, Butler died at his home in Sarasota, Florida.
