= GTRI Electronic Systems Laboratory =

Electronic Systems Laboratory
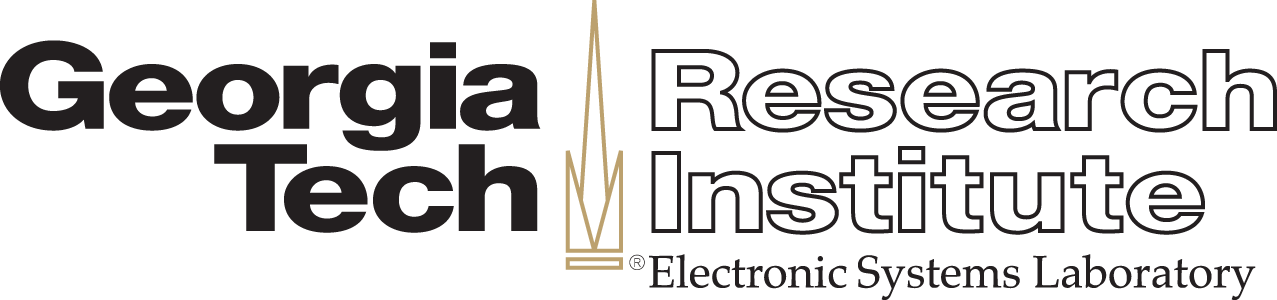
- Company type: Nonprofit
- Industry: Systems engineering, electronic warfare, human factors
- Headquarters: Atlanta, Georgia, USA
- Key people: Dr. Tommer Ender; Laboratory Director
- Parent: Georgia Tech Research Institute
- Website: www.gtri.gatech.edu/elsys

The Electronic Systems Laboratory (ELSYS) is one of eight labs in the Georgia Tech Research Institute and one of three labs under the Electronics, Optics, and Systems directorate. Among its research focuses are systems engineering, electronic warfare, and human systems integration.

== Research areas ==
ELSYS focuses on systems engineering solutions in electronic defense; modeling, simulation and analysis; countermeasures technique development; sensors performance analysis; electronic warfare; systems integration; standardized test procedures; flight test support; laboratory support stations and test systems; missile warning system improvements; technology insertion and human factors. ELSYS also specializes in mathematical modeling, analysis of dynamic systems, specialized instrumentation, and real-time simulation.

== Organization ==
ELSYS has five divisions: the Applied Embedded Systems Division (AES), the Test Engineering Division (TEN), the Systems Engineering Research Division (SERD), the Electronic Systems Integration Division (ESID), and the Human Systems Integration Division (HSI). HSI is the sole authorized consumer product test facility for the Arthritis Foundation, the Arthritis Society of Canada, Arthritis Australia, and Arthritis New Zealand.

In mid-2006, the GTRI Health and Environmental Systems Laboratory (HESL) was disbanded, and the staff were transferred to other parts of GTRI. ELSYS received many of these individuals, as it does a lot of HCI work, a field predominant in HESL. The Air National Guard Program Office is also under ELSYS.

== Locations ==
ELSYS' operations are spread across locations in and near Atlanta, Georgia: the Centennial Research Building on Georgia Tech's campus, the Georgia Public Broadcasting Building, and GTRI's Cobb County Research Facility. ELSYS also has a field office in Warner Robins, Georgia to provide on-site support for Robins AFB, along with field offices in Lexington Park, Maryland and Tucson, Arizona.
