= Samuel Graham (engineer) =

American engineer

- Education: Georgia Tech; Florida State University
- Scientific career
- Workplaces: Georgia Tech; Sandia National Laboratories
- Thesis: Effective thermal conductivity of damaged composites (1999)

Samuel Graham, Jr. is an American engineer and currently the dean of the Clark School of Engineering at the University of Maryland. He was previously the Eugene C. Gwaltney, Jr. School Chair and Professor at Georgia Tech. Graham is a Fellow of the American Society of Mechanical Engineers and serves on the Advisory Board of the Air Force Research Laboratory.

== Early life and education ==
Graham studied engineering at Florida State University. He was a graduate student at Georgia Tech, where he earned a doctoral degree under the supervision of David L. McDowell in 1999. After completing his PhD research, Graham joined Sandia National Laboratories.

== Research and career ==
In 2003 Graham was appointed Assistant Professor at Georgia Tech, where he leads the Electronics Manufacturing and Reliability Laboratory. His research considers the fabrication, encapsulation and packaging of semiconductor devices. Specifically, Graham has studied wide bandgap semiconductors (including gallium nitride, GaN, gallium oxide and hafnium dioxide), and how they interact with their substrates (including silicon carbide). Such materials are often used in radio frequency communications. In these devices, thermal resistance at interfaces limits their performance. To understand how the operational stability of devices based on these materials, Graham makes use of electro-thermal and thermomechanical modeling.

Beyond his work on inorganic materials, Graham has worked on devices made from organic electronic materials. Using vacuum-based deposition to create ultrathin barriers that protect organic materials from degradation. Such barriers are essential for the realization of wearable devices and next-generation displays based upon these materials.

In 2018 Graham was appointed Eugene C. Gwaltney, Jr. School Chair at Georgia Tech. He has worked with Baratunde A. Cola to create the Academic and Research Leadership (ARL) program, which prepares minority engineers for careers in academia and industry.

In 2021 Graham was appointed dean of the Clark School of Engineering at the University of Maryland. Graham's new position began October 1, 2021.

== Select publications ==
- Christensen, Adam; Graham, Samuel (2009-02-01). "Thermal effects in packaging high power light emitting diode arrays". Applied Thermal Engineering. 29 (2): 364–371. Bibcode:2009AppTE..29..364C. doi:10.1016/j.applthermaleng.2008.03.019. ISSN 1359-4311.
- Zhou, Yinhua; Fuentes-Hernandez, Canek; Shim, Jaewon; Meyer, Jens; Giordano, Anthony J.; Li, Hong; Winget, Paul; Papadopoulos, Theodoros; Cheun, Hyeunseok; Kim, Jungbae; Fenoll, Mathieu (2012-04-20). "A Universal Method to Produce Low–Work Function Electrodes for Organic Electronics". Science. 336 (6079): 327–332. Bibcode:2012Sci...336..327Z. doi:10.1126/science.1218829. ISSN 0036-8075. PMID 22517855. S2CID 9949593.
- Jackson, Roderick; Domercq, Benoit; Jain, Rishabh; Kippelen, Bernard; Graham, Samuel (2008). "Stability of Doped Transparent Carbon Nanotube Electrodes". Advanced Functional Materials. 18 (17): 2548–2554. doi:10.1002/adfm.200800324. ISSN 1616-3028. S2CID 98003769.

== Personal life ==
Graham is married with two children.
