= Cecil Alexander (architect) =

American architect

Cecil Abraham Alexander, Jr.
- Born: 14 March 1918; Atlanta, Georgia
- Died: 30 July 2013 (aged 95); Atlanta, Georgia
- Occupation: Architect
- Awards: Whitney Young Jr. Award, AIA
- Practice: FABRAP
- Buildings: Southern Bell Center, Atlanta–Fulton County Stadium

Cecil Abraham Alexander, Jr. (born Henry Alexander II, March 14, 1918 - July 30, 2013) was an American architect, principally a designer of commercial architecture, best known for his work in Atlanta, Georgia. He worked with the firm FABRAP, which, in 1985, became Rosser FABRAP International and later Rosser International. Together with other architects of the firm, he "shaped the skyline of Atlanta".

== Early life ==
Alexander was born to prosperous Jewish parents Julia (née Moses, 1882-1938) and Cecil Alexander (1877-1952) in the Virginia-Highland section of Atlanta. Cecil Alexander, Sr. was the owner of a successful hardware company, J.M. Alexander & Company, which he sold to King Hardware in 1947. Named Henry Alexander at birth, he was named after an uncle who was unmarried at the time. When he was five years old, his "Uncle Harry" had married and the couple gave birth to a son. It was decided that young Henry would relinquish his name to his younger cousin and would, instead, be named after his own father, Cecil Alexander, Sr.

Alexander attended the Marist School, where he was a classmate of actor and television presenter Bert Parks, and graduated from Boys High School in Atlanta. He enrolled in 1936 at the Georgia Institute of Technology, where he spent one year before transferring to Yale University in New Haven, Connecticut, where he served as managing editor of The Yale Record, the campus humor magazine, and received a bachelor's degree in architecture in 1940. He continued graduate studies at the Massachusetts Institute of Technology in Cambridge, Massachusetts. In 1946, following his military service in World War II, he enrolled in the graduate architecture program and earned his master's degree at Harvard University in Cambridge, Massachusetts, where he studied with Walter Gropius, the founder of the Bauhaus school, which was a major influence on the development of modern architecture.

Alexander married Hermione "Hermi" Weil of New Orleans before serving in the United States Marines during World War II. While on active duty, he earned the Distinguished Flying Cross twice. After the war, Alexander and Hermione had three children. Hermione died on October 25, 1983, when the car the couple was driving in was hit by a young drunk driver. Later, Alexander founded the Hermione Weil Alexander Fund Committee to Combat Drugged and Drunken Driving in her memory. He later remarried, this time to the former Helen Eisemann Harris, an actress and close friend of Hermione's.

== Architecture and civic leadership ==
Alexander's architectural work includes many commercial structures. He helped design one of Atlanta's first International style buildings, a building for the Rich's Store for Homes. Other works in Atlanta include:

- AT&T Midtown Center, formerly Southern Bell headquarters (1980), a landmark on the Midtown skyline
- Atlanta–Fulton County Stadium (1965, razed 1997)
- Coca-Cola headquarters (1970, 1979, 1981)
- Georgia Power Company Corporate Headquarters
- Peachtree and 7th Building (now the Peachtree Lofts), Midtown
- State of Georgia Building (former First National Bank headquarters)

He designed just eight houses, including one "Florida modern"-styled one, and one other modern one being his own, the Cecil and Hermione Alexander House, one of the first modernist style houses in Atlanta. His home was listed on the U.S. National Register of Historic Places in March, 2010.

He was also a civic leader of Atlanta, Georgia.

He was active in civil rights and this sometimes caused disruption. After FABRAP had won a major commission, for a 40-story commercial tower slated to be the largest building in the Southeast of the United States, an executive of the firm asked for Alexander to be removed from the project.He also resigned from the school board of the Lovett School in 1963 after the school refused to de-segregate by admitting Martin Luther King III.

== Georgia state flag ==
Georgia state flag 2001-2003

He proposed an alternative version of the Georgia state flag, greatly reducing its emphasis on the controversial Confederate battle flag, which had been incorporated into the state flag in 1956. His proposal, which included an image of just a small version of the previous flag along with other previous state flags, was rejected at first. Under a later governor, Roy Barnes, after a slight modification accepted by Alexander the design was adopted. The new flag was itself very controversial. It served as the official state flag from 2001 to 2003, when it was replaced by another version that completely omitted the rebel flag.

== Later years ==
Alexander retired in 1985 but collaborated in various projects, including one or more associated with the 1996 Olympics games in Atlanta.

He received the Whitney M. Young, Jr., award from the AIA for his work in civil rights. He also received the Ivan Allen Award for community service, and the Yale Medal in 1982 for distinguished alumni.

Alexander died on July 30, 2013. He was 95. He was survived by his wife, Helen; three children; five grandchildren; two great-grandchildren; and many other family, including his nephew, economist Roman L. Weil.
