= Bill Finch (architect) =

American architect

James H. "Bill" Finch (1913 in Atlanta – July 28, 2003) was an American Architect and founder of architectural firm FABRAP.

== Early life and education ==
Finch graduated from the Georgia Institute of Technology in 1936 with a BS Architecture.

== Career ==
Finch was also a retired US Marine Lt. Colonel. He saw combat on Iwo Jima and was, at one part in the epic battle, Executive Officer of the battalion in the 28th Regiment which raised the flag on Mount Suribachi. He also saw service in the Korean War.

Known as a modernist, in a city, he was also reported to have disliked excessive parking lots and unburied wires. Major projects he had a hand in include Atlanta Stadium (1965), Five Points MARTA station (1979), Coca-Cola headquarters (1980) and BellSouth tower (1982) (now Tower Square).
