= Heery =

Heery is a surname. Notable people with the surname include:

- Eamon Heery, Irish Gaelic football player
- George T. Heery (1927—2021), American architect, founder of Heery International, an Atlanta-based architectural firm
- Séamus Heery (1927–2014), Irish Gaelic footballer
