= FABRAP =

- Type: Private
- Industry: Architecture
- Predecessor: Finch Barnes and Paschal; Alexander and Rothschild
- Founded: 1958
- Defunct: 1984
- Fate: merged
- Successor: Rosser International
- Headquarters: Atlanta, Georgia,
- Products: stadiums, headquarters, homes

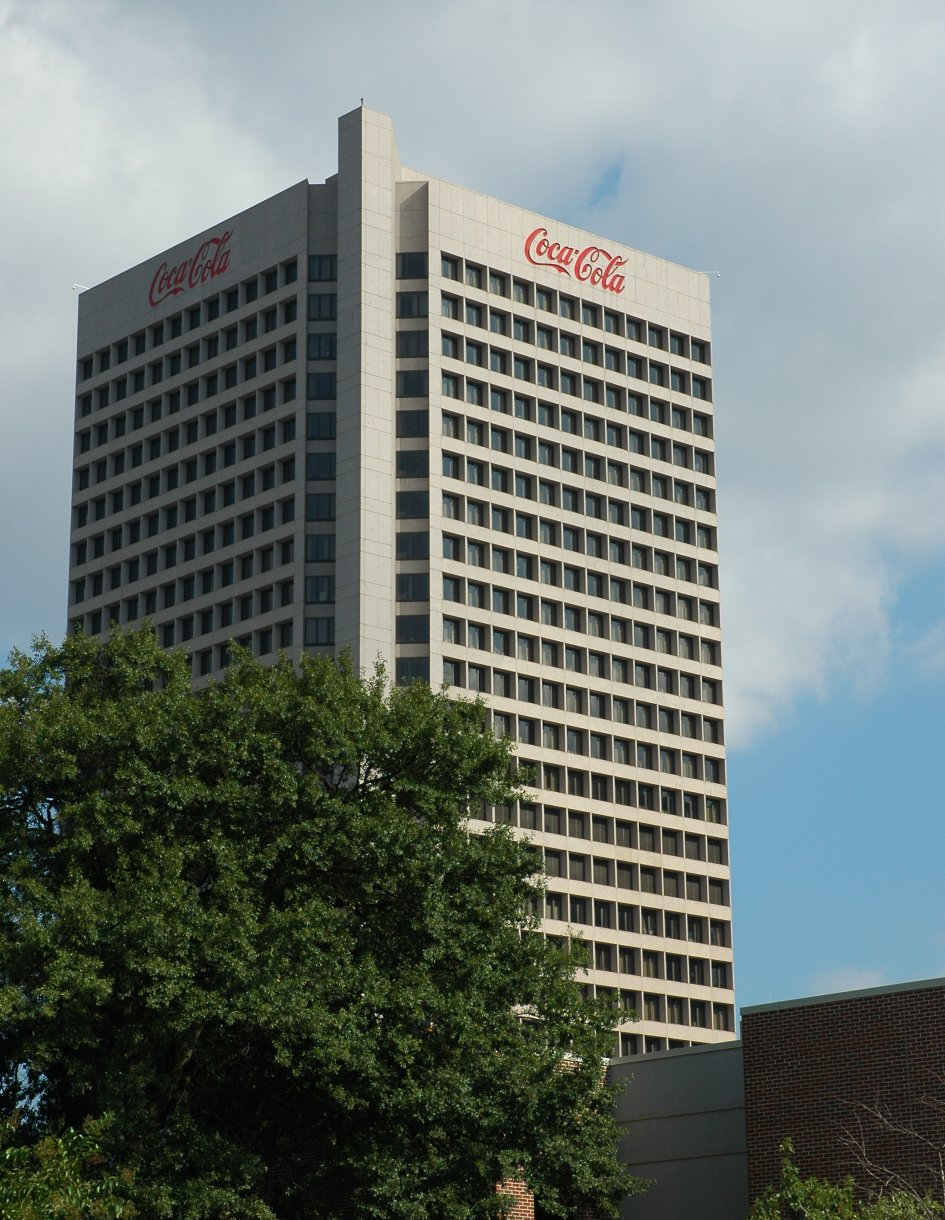
The Coca-Cola headquarters in Atlanta, Georgia, designed by FABRAP and completed in 1979.

FABRAP, or Finch, Alexander, Barnes, Rothschild and Paschal, was an architectural firm founded in Atlanta, Georgia in 1958. They specialized in sports stadiums, and developed the headquarters for several major Atlanta businesses.

== History ==
In 1948 James H. "Bill" Finch and Miller Barnes, two Georgia Institute of Technology graduates, joined to form architectural firm Finch and Barnes. Caraker Paschal, also a Georgia Tech graduate, became a partner in 1957 to form Finch Barnes and Paschal. In 1958 Cecil Alexander and Bernard "Rocky" Rothschild joined the firm to create FABRAP. FABRAP embraced the International style popular at the time.

FABRAP partnered with Heery and Heery, another major Atlanta architecture firm, in 1965 to develop the Atlanta–Fulton County Stadium. Following the quick completion of this stadium, the partnership gained a large business in developing sports facilities, including the $45 million Riverfront Stadium in Cincinnati, Ohio in 1970. FABRAP was hired and partnered with other firms to develop the headquarters for First National Bank in 1966, Coca-Cola in 1979, and Southern Bell in 1982.

In 1984 FABRAP merged with Atlanta engineering firm Rosser White Hobbs Davidson McClellan Kelly to form Rosser Fabrap International. In 1993 the firm was renamed Rosser International.
