= Charles B. Thomsen =

American architect and construction manager

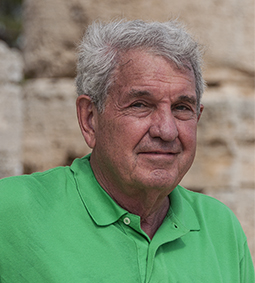
- Born: September 25, 1932 (age 93); Springfield, Missouri
- Education: University of Oklahoma, University of Minnesota, Massachusetts Institute of Technology
- Occupations: Architect, Construction Manager, Educator
- Spouse: Lois Ann (Leivestad) Thomsen
- Children: Charles Jeffrey Thomsen, Melissa Ann Thomsen
- Practice: CRS Group, 3D/International
- Website: www.charlesthomsen.com

Charles Burton "Chuck" Thomsen FAIA FCMAA (born September 25, 1932) is an American architect, construction manager, corporate executive and educator. He is the son of Fred Charles Thomsen and Sunbeam Burton Thomsen.

== Early life and education ==
Thomsen grew up in Fayetteville, Arkansas; Albuquerque, New Mexico; and Springfield, Missouri. He served in the Marine Corps, attended the University of Oklahoma, the University of Minnesota and Massachusetts Institute of Technology.

== Career ==
=== Educator ===
After graduation from MIT, Thomsen taught design and the history of modern art and architecture at Rice School of Architecture.

During his career, he was continually active in academic activities. He lectured annually at the Harvard Graduate School of Design. After retirement, he returned to teach a graduate seminar at Rice University. He served on the advisory boards of several architecture schools and frequently speaks at colleges and universities.

=== Technology ===
While teaching at Rice, Thomsen began applying computer technology to planning and architecture. In 1964, as part of a research program for community planning funded by the Ford Foundation, Thomsen used a vacuum tube computer in the Rice electrical engineering department to analyze the need for community facilities in Chile. Around this same time, he worked part-time for CRS (Caudill Rowlett Scott; Caudill was also the Dean of Architecture at Rice). At CRS, Thomsen worked with John Harris (with W.S. Bellows Construction) to develop a computer program to optimize the income from high-rise office building construction.

As one of the early practitioners in professional construction management and Fast-Track Construction, Thomsen developed many of the first computer applications for design and construction.

When he joined CRS full-time in 1965, Thomsen’s first job was to investigate the use of computer technology in design and construction. As part of that investigation he developed a management information system, one of the first in the industry, for the company. Thomsen also wrote what is thought to be the first computer-based construction-cost estimating system. He wrote subsequent programs for specification retrieval, elevator design and parametric estimating and led efforts to develop software to help master planning for college and university campuses.

Throughout his career, Thomsen initiated the development of many computer-based management support and control systems for design and construction programs. He guided 3D/International’s IT research and development.

=== CRS, CM Inc. and 3D/International ===
As an executive with CRS and 3D/International, Thomsen worked on hundreds of projects in 20 countries in all three basic roles: designer, manager and at-risk constructor.

After working two years in the CRS home office in Houston, he moved to New York (in 1967) to lead the CRS New York office. While there he led a study for the New York State University Construction Fund that was named Fast Track. The study was credited with coining the term.

Also during the mid-1960s, Thomsen was part of a small group of other professionals, including Louis N. Vic Maloof FAIA RIBA FCMAA and George Heery FAIA ROBA FCMAA, who met frequently to develop Construction Management concepts.

In 1971, CRS created a parent company (CRS Design Associates) and became the first architectural firm to be publicly held. The holding company created a subsidiary (CM Associates) that was one of the first companies formed specifically to provide construction management services. Thomsen was appointed President and Chairman.

In 1980, Thomsen was appointed Executive Vice President of the holding company (renamed CRS Group Inc.) and was made President and CEO in 1981. In 1982, after objecting to an acquisition, he was asked to resign.

He then joined 3D/International as President and led that company as President or Chairman for 24 years. 3D/I provided architecture, engineering and construction management services and opened offices throughout the U.S., Mid East, Asia and Europe. Notable projects were the Pentagon Renovation (including reconstruction after 9/11), the renovation of the Utah State Capitol and the development plan for the Thurgood Marshall office building on Capitol Hill.

He created and led 3D/I’s R&D group that did extensive research into the innovative practices of serial builders, private and public. The research provided a foundation for a book, Program Management and its major revision with Sid Sanders, Program Management 2.0. (See Books by Thomsen below.)

== Honors ==
Fellow in the American Institute of Architects (1979). Citation: “For innovation in Fast Track and sharing his methodology with others.”

Fellow in the Construction Management Association of America (2002). Citation: “Pioneer and Leader.” (Thomsen is the first person to be a Fellow in both the American Institute of Architects and the Construction Management Association of America.)

Chancellor, Construction Management Association of America College of Fellows (2008-2009)

Elected to the National Academy of Construction (2008). Citation: “Pioneering leadership in program and construction management and development of information technology for the construction industry." In 2019, Thomsen was selected for the Academy’s highest annual award, the Ted C. Kennedy Award for lifetime achievement.

== Books by Thomsen ==
- Thomsen, Chuck; Managing Brainpower, The American Institute of Architects Press 1989
- Thomsen, Chuck; CM: Developing, Marketing and Delivering Construction Management Services, McGraw Hill 1981
- Thomsen FAIA FCMAA, Chuck; Program Management: Concepts and Strategies for Managing Capital Building Programs, Construction Management Association of America and AIA 2008
- Thomsen, Chuck; Sanders, Sid; Program Management 2.0: Concepts and Strategies for Managing Capital Building Programs (Revised), Construction Management Association of America 2008
- Thomsen, Chuck FAIA FCMAA; John R. Hawkins Esq. AIA; Charles J. Thomsen GC; CM, Fast-Track and GMP, Building Great Projects and Avoiding Conflict Through Understanding, Construction Management Association of America and AIA 2012

== Articles by Thomsen ==
"Managing Integrated Project Delivery" (with Joel Darrington Esq.; Dennis Dunne, FCMAA; Will Lichtig Esq.), Construction Management Association of America, white paper November, December 2009

"The 21st Century Master Builder", The Military Engineer, April–May 1999

Contributed two chapters, Professional Practice 101, Wiley, 1997

"Do It. Teaming", The Military Engineer, November–December 1994

"Managing Large Projects? Knowing More than How to Build", The Military Engineer, October 1991

"Clients are the Angels of Invention", Architectural Record, August 1986

"Architecture '85", AIA Journal, 1985

"Are Personal Computers Ready for the Big Firms?", Architectural Record, July 1984

"Construction Management: What's Happened to It? Is it still valid? Construction Management, in a Miami Test, Saves $1.5 Million", Architectural Record, January 1977

"Project Accounting: Cost Control Stabilizer", series in Architectural Record, May 1975

"CM Methods Speed Puerto Rican Schools", Building Design and Construction, December 1975

"Pros and Cons of a GMP", Architectural Record, 1975

"Value Analysis: Total Project Cost Perspective", series in Architectural Record, March 1975

"What Construction Management Can Do For You", American School and University, 1974

"Coping With the New Unpredictability of Prices and Supply", AIA Journal, 1974

"Estimating Provides the Scale for Budget Control", series in Architectural Record, October 1974

"Project Purchasing Strategy: CM Tool for Cost Control", series in Architectural Record, May 1974

"Budgeting Method: Key to Top Building Value", series in Architectural Record, February 1974

"An Overview of Cost Management", series in Architectural Record, September 1973

"Schools in a Hurry" (with Joseph Scarano), Progressive Architecture, February 1971
