= United Supermarkets Arena =

Arena in Lubbock, Texas, United States

- Entertainment Showcase of West Texas; The USA

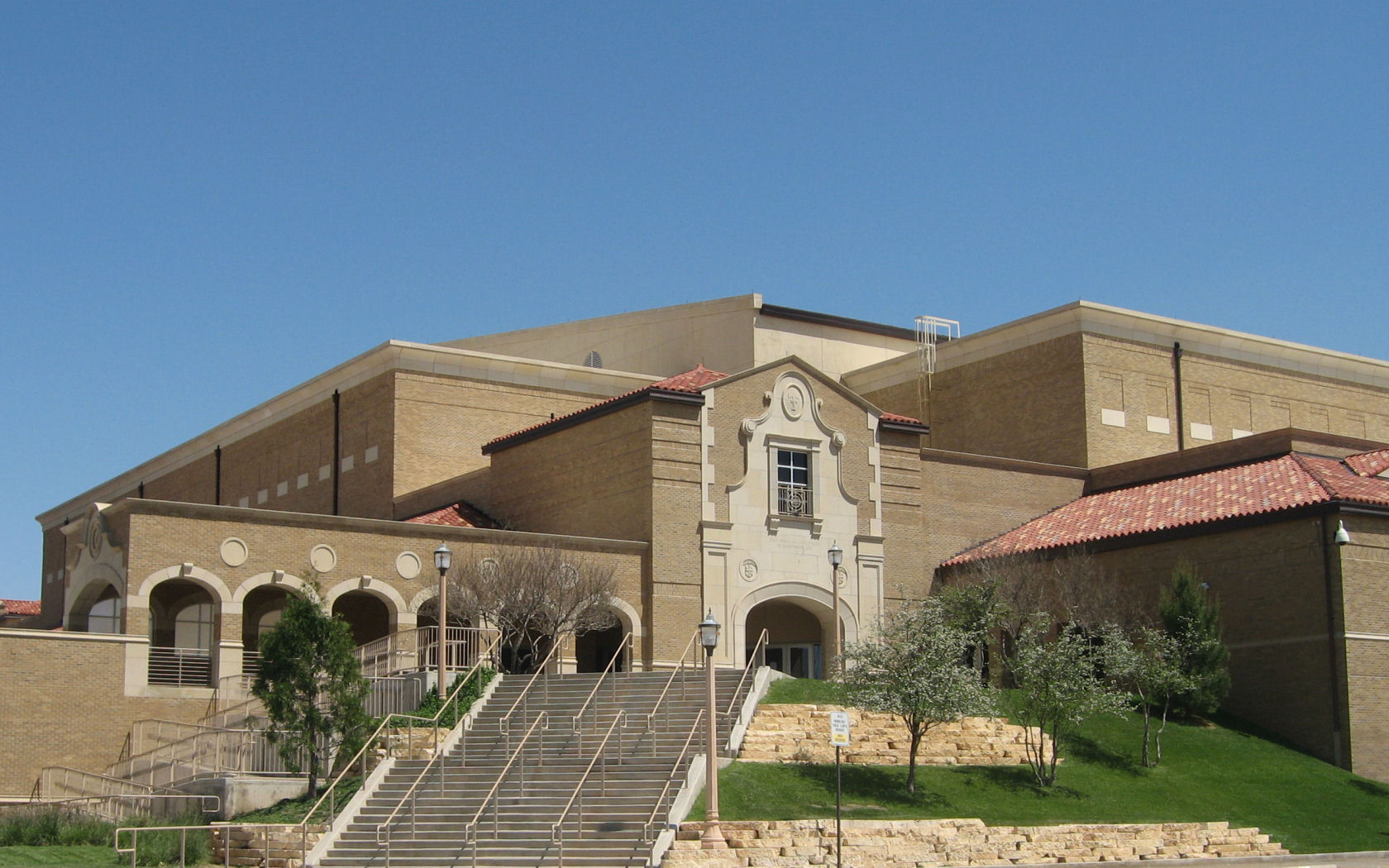
- Interactive map of United Supermarkets Arena
- Former names: United Spirit Arena (1999–2014)
- Location: 1701 Indiana Avenue; Lubbock, TX 79409
- Coordinates: 33°34′52.54″N 101°53′11.89″W
- Owner: Texas Tech University
- Operator: Texas Tech University
- Capacity: 15,098 (present); 15,050 (1999–2001)
- Surface: Hardwood

Construction
- Groundbreaking: March 26, 1997
- Opened: October 1, 1999
- Cost: $62.775 million ($121 million in 2025 dollars)
- Architects: Rosser International; Joe D. Mckay AIA Architects
- Project manager: Hill International
- General contractor: Centex Construction Co.

Tenant
- Texas Tech Red Raiders (NCAA DI) (1999–present)

United Supermarkets Arena (previously the United Spirit Arena) is a multipurpose arena on the campus of Texas Tech University in Lubbock, Texas. The 15,098-seat arena opened in 1999 and is home to the Texas Tech Red Raiders basketball, Texas Tech Lady Raiders basketball, and Texas Tech Red Raiders women's volleyball teams.

== History ==
The City of Lubbock proposed replacing the Lubbock Municipal Coliseum with a new arena named after Buddy Holly. The proposed Buddy Holly Arena was to be located next to the Lubbock Memorial Civic Center in downtown Lubbock, not on the Texas Tech University campus. A public referendum for a tax increase to build the arena failed to pass by as few as 600 votes. Texas Tech decided to move construction to an on-campus facility with private donations on the university's campus.

The arena was financed from a $500 million fundraising endeavor undertaken by John T. Montford, the first chancellor of the Texas Tech University System. Groundbreaking began on March 26, 1997. The arena opened on October 1, 1999, at a cost of $62.775 million.

== Design ==
The arena features a Spanish Renaissance exterior facade, matching architectural style of the rest of the Texas Tech University campus. Architects for the project included Joe D. McKay AIA Architects, and Rosser International. Hill International was the project manager, and the general contractor was Centex Construction Co.

Standing at the southeast entrance of the arena is the eight-story Victory Tower. At 96 feet (29 m), Victory Tower is the 16th-tallest structure in Lubbock.

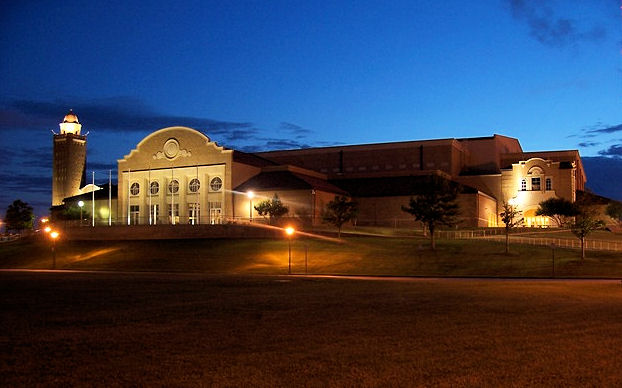
The arena at night

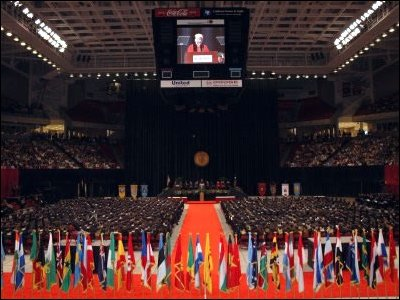
Inside United Supermarkets Arena prior to a graduation ceremony

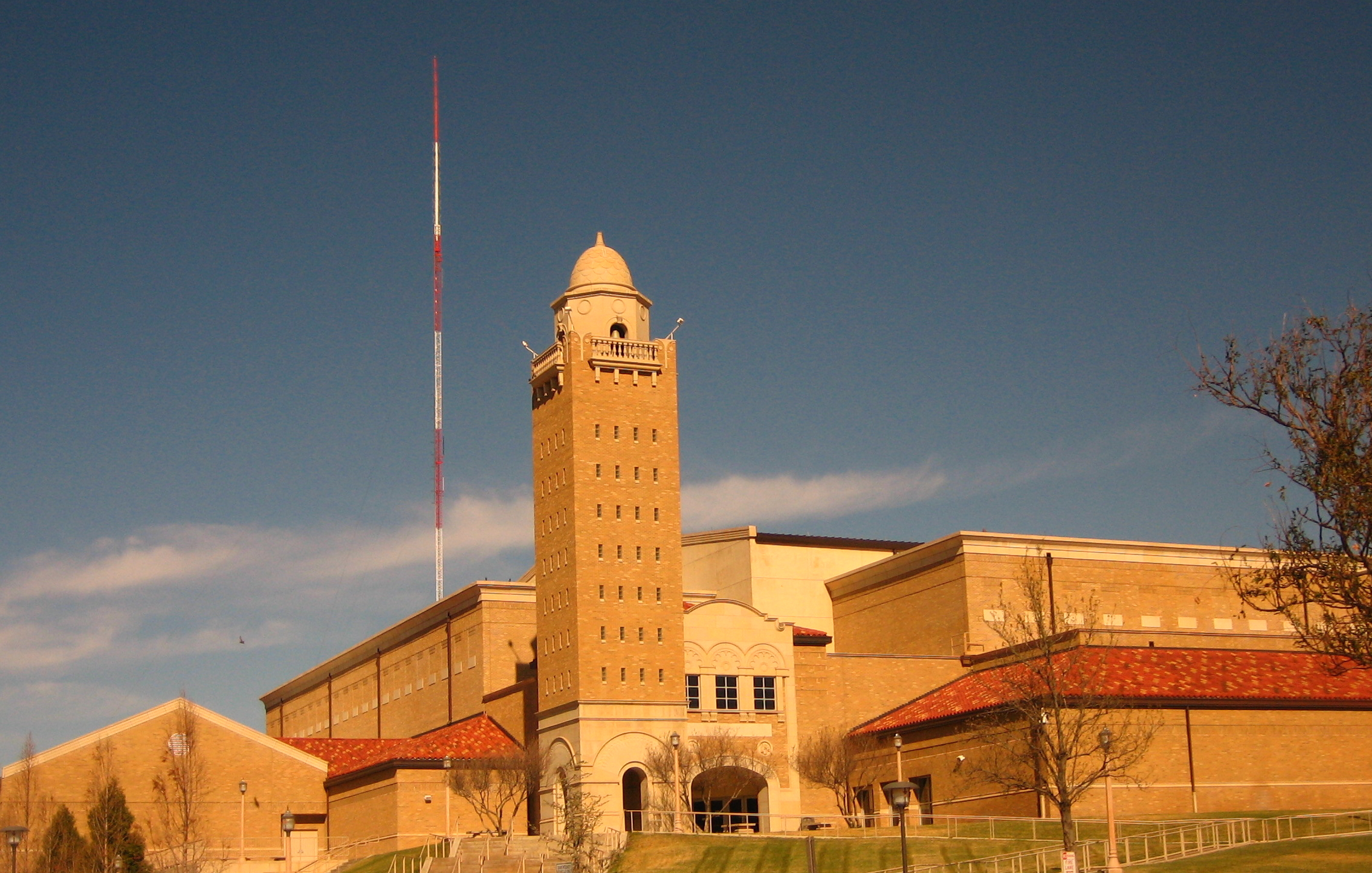
Victory Tower at the southeast entrance

== Naming rights ==
Lubbock-based supermarket chain United Supermarkets purchased the naming rights to the facility under a 20-year, $10 million naming-rights agreement with Texas Tech University in 1996. Until 2014, the arena was known as United Spirit Arena. Following a 10-year, $9.45 million naming-rights extension, the arena was renamed United Supermarkets Arena. Funds from the 10-year naming rights extension will go towards facility renovations.

== Usage ==
=== Texas Tech Red Raiders basketball ===
- The first basketball game was played in the arena on November 19, 1999. The Texas Tech Red Raiders lost 68–60 to the Indiana Hoosiers, coached by Naismith Memorial Basketball Hall of Fame inductee Bob Knight, who would later become the head coach of Red Raiders basketball team.
- On January 1, 2007, a 70–68 defeat of the New Mexico Lobos by the Texas Tech Red Raiders marked the 880th total win for Bob Knight, making him the winningest coach in men's college basketball history.
- A Big 12 Conference record for student attendance was set February 25, 2014, against Kansas State.

=== NCAA Tournaments ===
NCAA Division I Women's Basketball First and Second Rounds: 2000, 2001, 2002, 2003, 2009, 2013, and WNIT Tournament First Round 2023.

=== Gymnastics ===
On October 2, 2016, the arena hosted the Kellogg's Tour of Gymnastics Champions.

=== WNBA ===
On May 4, 2007, the Houston Comets with former Lady Raiders Sheryl Swoopes and Erin Grant played a Women's National Basketball Association exhibition game against the Detroit Shock with Plenette Pierson, also a former Lady Raider.

=== WWE ===
United Supermarkets Arena hosted WWE Raw (the first Raw ever to be hosted in Lubbock) in May 2006.

=== Concerts ===
Date	Artist	Opening act(s)	Tour / Concert name	Attendance	Revenue	Notes
February 8, 2000	Elton John	—	Medusa Tour	—	—	First concert to be held at the arena.
October 18, 2000	Pearl Jam	Supergrass	Binaural Tour			Performance of "Parting Ways" was included on the Touring Band 2000 DVD.
June 14, 2002	Britney Spears	—	Dream Within a Dream Tour	14,256 / 14,256	$741,972	After the second song, "(You Drive Me) Crazy", a power outage occurred and the rest of the concert had to be canceled. Spears, along with her tour manager, came onstage to explain the situation to the sold-out crowd. Due to Spears being overbooked for the entire tour, there was no time to reschedule the concert.
October 14, 2011	Taylor Swift	—	Speak Now World Tour	10,419 / 10,419	$710,426	Tickets for the show were sold out within 20 minutes after going on sale, the fastest sell-out in the arena's history.
January 18, 2013	George Strait	Martina McBride	The Cowboy Rides Away Tour	—	—	
March 17, 2013	Bon Jovi	—	Because We Can: The Tour	13,255 / 13,255	$1,201,105	This concert marks Richie Sambora's last with the band.
October 2, 2014	Paul McCartney	—	Out There	11,446 / 11,446	$1,820,456	Originally scheduled for June 14, but was postponed due to illness.
March 30, 2017	Garth Brooks; Trisha Yearwood	—	The Garth Brooks World Tour with Trisha Yearwood	—	—	This show was sold out and 4 more shows were added, all of which were sold out.
March 31, 2017	Garth Brooks; Trisha Yearwood	—	The Garth Brooks World Tour with Trisha Yearwood	—	—	This show was sold out and 4 more shows were added, all of which were sold out.
April 1, 2017	Garth Brooks; Trisha Yearwood	—	The Garth Brooks World Tour with Trisha Yearwood	—	—	This show was sold out and 4 more shows were added, all of which were sold out.
April 2, 2017	Garth Brooks; Trisha Yearwood	—	The Garth Brooks World Tour with Trisha Yearwood	—	—	This show was sold out and 4 more shows were added, all of which were sold out.
March 2, 2019	Metallica	Jim Breuer	World Wired Tour	—	—	This concert featured the live debut of Here Comes Revenge.
March 26, 2023	TobyMac	CrowderCochren & Co Tasha Layton Jon Reddick Terrian	Hits Deep Tour 2023	—	—	
May 7, 2023	For King & Country	—	What Are We Waiting For Tour: Part II	—	—	

== See also ==
- List of NCAA Division I basketball arenas
