= UniverSoul Circus =

Circus established in 1994 in Atlanta

Origin
- Country: United States
- Founder(s): Cedric Walker
- Year founded: 1994

Information
- Ringmaster(s): Lucky and Chyeanne
- Traveling show?: Yes
- Circus tent?: Purple and yellow tent
- Type of acts: 12
- Website: universoulcircus.com

The UniverSoul Circus is a single ring circus, established in 1994 by Cedric Walker, an African-American man who wanted to create a circus with a large percentage of people of color performing. It is headquartered in Atlanta, Georgia, United States.

== History ==
The UniverSoul Circus was founded in 1994.

Recruiting, training and production began in 1993. The first performance took place in 1994 in the parking lot of Atlanta Fulton County Stadium. By 1997 the circus tour grew to 10 cities, 19 cities in 1999, 31 cities in 2000, and 32 cities in 2005. An Emmy Award-winning special featuring the circus debuted in 1998 on cable TV network HBO. A tour of South Africa, the first international destination, was completed in 2001.

UniverSoul Circus through some of its animal vendors has had several animal cruelty allegations since 1997. It also has had incidents of animals escaping.
