= Florida modern =

Florida modern is an architectural style.

According to professor Jan Hochstim, Florida modern reflects wider development than the Sarasota modern school.

Architect Cecil Alexander designed one house in this style.

== See also ==
- Miami Modern Architecture
- Sarasota School of Architecture
- Architecture of Jacksonville
