= Georgia Power Company Corporate Headquarters =

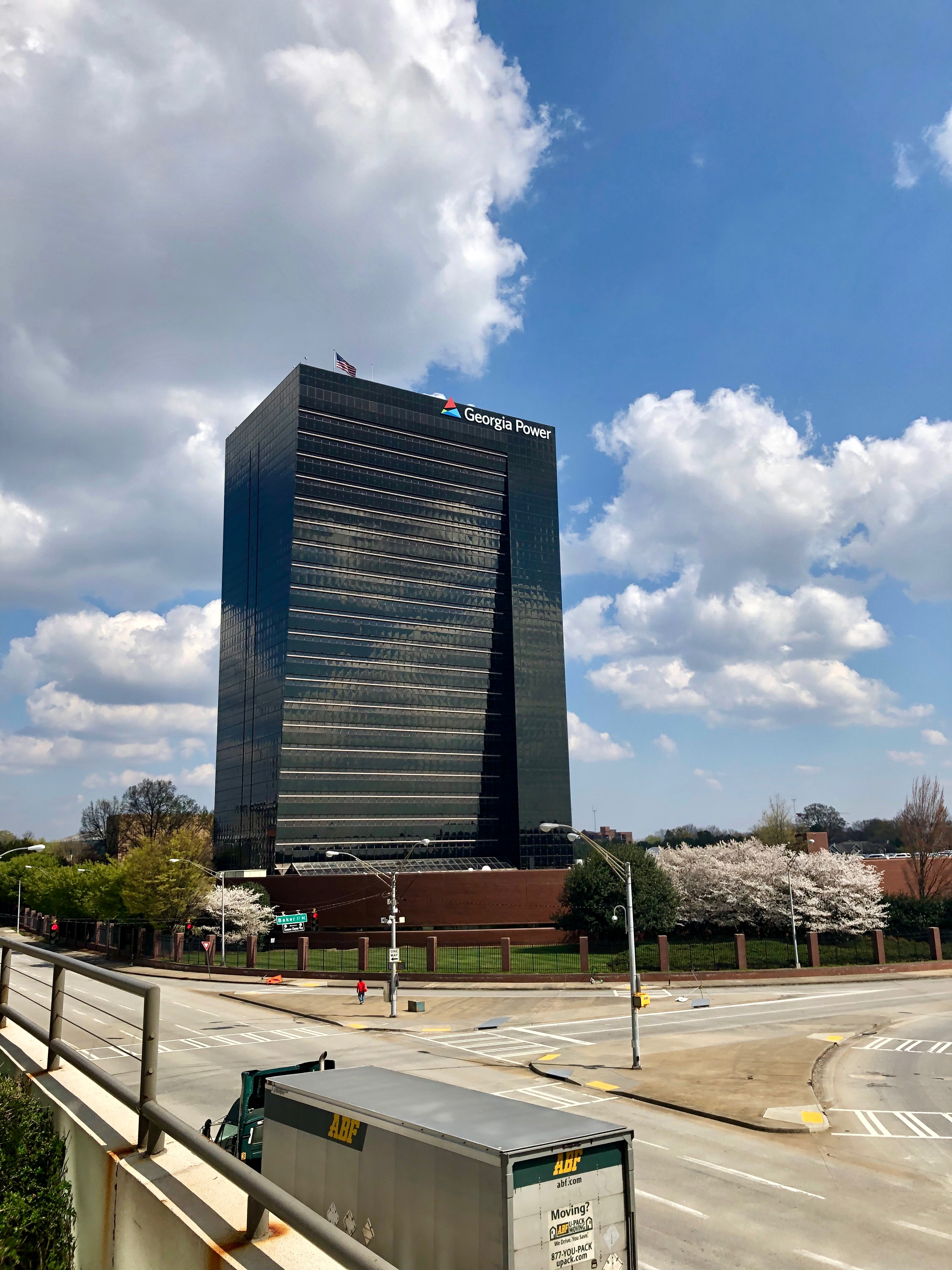
- Interactive map of Georgia Power Company Corporate Headquarters
- Alternative names: Georgia Power Building

General information
- Type: Commercial offices
- Location: 241 Ralph McGill Boulevard; Atlanta, Georgia
- Coordinates: 33.7638°N 84.3820°W
- Completed: 1981

Height
- Roof: 91.1 m (299 ft)

Technical details
- Floor count: 24

Design and construction
- Architect: Heery International

The Georgia Power Company Corporate Headquarters is a 24-story, 91 m (299 ft) skyscraper in downtown Atlanta, Georgia serving Georgia Power, a subsidiary of Southern Company. The prior Georgia Power headquarters building was in downtown Atlanta at the corner of Alabama and Forsyth streets in the former Atlanta Constitution Building.

== Passive solar design ==
Completed in 1981 the building utilizes 4,500 tons (4,000 metric tons) of structural steel, and its floors have a passive solar design, with each floor on the south-facing side extending 15 in (380 mm) beyond the one below. In summer, when the sun is high in the sky, each extension partially shades the windows below; in winter, when the sun is lower in the southern sky, it shines directly into the windows to assist with space heating. This design allows for the building to use nearly 60% less energy than most other buildings of the sort. Because of this incremental increase in floor size from the ground to the roof on the southern facade, the building is sometimes referred to as the "Leaning Tower of Power".

== Solar thermal project ==
When the building opened, it featured an experimental solar thermal project on the south plaza [see "Further reading" below], which was dismantled after a few years due to maintenance costs and scarcity and expense of replacement parts. The solar project on the south plaza of the Georgia Power Company headquarters building in the early 1980s consisted of 1,482 parabolic trough (line focus) concentrating collectors with a total surface area of 23,712 square feet (2,202.9 m^{2}). Each glass-lined collector had a length of 8 feet (2.4 m) and an aperture of 2 feet (0.61 m). Pressurized water from a 6,000-US-gallon (23,000 L; 5,000 imp gal) storage tank under the plaza was cycled through the tubes in the collectors and heated to about 300 °F (149 °C) for use in the building's heating and absorption air conditioning systems.
