= George T. Heery =

American architect (1927–2021)

- George Heery at desk in 2007
- Born: June 18, 1927; Athens, Georgia
- Died: January 21, 2021 (aged 93); Atlanta, Georgia
- Education: Georgia Institute of Technology
- Occupation: Architect

George T. Heery, FAIA RIBA FCMAA (June 18, 1927—January 21, 2021) was an American architect and known for developing the concepts of Construction Program Management, Strategic Facilities Planning and the Bridging Method of project delivery.

== Early life and education ==
Born in Athens, Georgia, Heery served in the Pacific arena in the U.S. Navy in the later years of World War II, entering college upon an honorable discharge in 1946. He graduated from the Georgia Institute of Technology in 1951, with a Bachelor of Science and Bachelor of Architecture. Later he completed the Advanced Management Program at the Harvard Business School.

== Career ==
=== Heery and Heery ===
In 1952, George Heery entered private practice by joining with his architect father, C. Wilmer Heery Jr., who had an established firm in Athens, Georgia. Together, George and his father formed Heery and Heery, with Wilmer Heery continuing to practice in Athens, Georgia, and George leading the Atlanta office. George Heery, along with other notable architects such as Joe Amisano, John Portman, Tom Ventulett, and Jerome Cooper, was considered to be among the first generation of modern architects in post-war Georgia.

By the late 1960s Heery & Heery had established a reputation of delivering projects under intensely short schedules. In Marietta, Georgia, the company designed and built a 54,000-square-foot (5,000 m^{2}) production plant for the C-5 Galaxy transport aircraft for Lockheed Aircraft Corporation in only 160 days, a full three weeks ahead of schedule. More often than not these "double-quick" projects were industrial facilities, prompting criticisms that much of the firm's work lacked architectural character. Manufacturing clients like Lockheed were more concerned about meeting schedules.

You get done in a day what usually takes a week. Heery has a better understanding of schedules than any other architect in the business. Most of them you can't push, but Heery pushes himself. When the contract for the C-5 was let, we had the long lead-time items signed, we were ready to break ground.

— James W. Denny Jr., project manager for Lockheed's airbus plant, Business Week magazine - August 10, 1968

In 1968 Heery & Heery was ranked as the first or second largest architectural firm in Atlanta, Georgia, and among the top five largest in the southern United States.

=== Construction Program Management ===
During the late 1950s, Heery developed a set of combined architectural, engineering, and project management procedures for greatly accelerating design and construction for industrial projects. During the mid-1960s, Heery and a small group of other professionals, including Louis N. Vic Maloof, FAIA, RIBA, FCMAA and Chuck Thomsen, FAIA, FCMAA, developed the concept of Construction Program Management for the purpose of controlling time and cost on behalf of the owner in construction programs.

=== Heery International ===
By the 1980s the firm had grown and changed names to Heery International and Heery was Chairman, CEO and the largest shareholder of the largest program management, architectural and engineering firm in the Southeast with over 500 employees. Over a 17-year span, from the mid-1960s to the early 1980s, Heery oversaw an expansion of the firm's vision and capabilities.

Milestones of that expansion include:

1965: The firm, in association with the architectural firm of Finch, Alexander, Barnes, Rothschild, and Pascal (FABRAP), designed and managed the construction of the Atlanta–Fulton County Stadium in less than one year. Later the association became known as Heery-FABRAP, which carried out the design and construction management for over 100 major stadiums and arenas, as well as the Central Station for Atlanta's MARTA system.
1966: The purchase of an interior design firm that became Heery Interiors.
1967: The formation of Heery Program Management providing construction program management services.
1969: Heery Graphics is formed.
1970: The acquisition of the mechanical engineering firm of J. W. Austin, which when added to the firm's existing in-house electrical and structural engineering departments, became Heery Engineering.
1974: George Heery authored Time, Cost, and Architecture which Engineering News Record Magazine cited as "The first definitive work on construction management".
1976: Heery opens offices in London and Frankfurt in addition to offices already existing in Baltimore, San Diego, Los Angeles, New York and Amman, Jordan.
1978: Heery Energy Consultants is formed.
1982: Heery Land Planning is formed to provide civil engineering and landscape architecture

In 1986, George Heery and the other shareholders at Heery International sold the company to British Insulated Callender's Cables (BICC), a publicly traded British Company, later known as Balfour Beatty. Heery was required by the sale to continue as CEO until March 1989.

=== Satulah Group ===
In 1989, George Heery co-founded Satulah Group with his two older children, Shepherd and Laura Heery. The firm included four business units: corporate real estate project management outsourcing; Brookwood Design Group, a design practice committed to the Bridging method and planning; an information technologies unit based around a small software development group in support of corporate real estate functions; and one real estate development activity largely devoted to project management for converting banking facilities after bank mergers and acquisitions.

=== Brookwood Group ===
On January 1, 1998, Satulah Group sold its corporate real estate project management outsourcing business units to LaSalle Partners of Chicago, now Jones Lang LaSalle, and changed its name to Brookwood Group, retaining the Development Management and Architectural and Planning services group.

== Significant projects ==
Heery served as Principal-in-Charge for a number of significant projects and/or consulting assignments at Brookwood including planning and management assignments for Georgia State University, Emory University, Spelman College, Morehouse College, Georgia Tech (his alma mater), The University Financing Foundation, California Polytechnic State University, the University of California, Irvine, the University of Toledo, West Virginia University, the University of South Carolina Upstate, Milliken and Co., AFLAC, The Coca-Cola Company, Oschner Clinic Foundation, Chemical Bank, Scientific-Atlanta, City of Nashville (Arena), Turner Broadcasting, Intermet Corporation and The Wakefield, the development project of the shareholders of the firm.

While heading Heery International, George Heery was responsible for many significant design projects in Atlanta, Georgia, including The Coca-Cola Company Central Reception Building, the Coke USA building and a major expansion of the corporate campus; the Georgia Power Headquarters; the First Union Bank Tower at 999 Peachtree Street; the Fuqua Conservatory; and the American Cancer Society Headquarters. In New York, Heery oversaw Heery's design of pedestrian level renovations and entrances for Rockefeller Center. In London, he was responsible for Citibank's U.K. Headquarters expansion, for the Salomon Brothers Trading Room above Victoria Station and for the winning design of the proposed 2,500,000-square-foot (230,000 m^{2}) North Quay at the London Docklands development project. In Florida, Heery was responsible for the Walt Disney World Village (now known as Disney Springs) and Disney's Typhoon Lagoon at Orlando.

Design, planning and design consulting projects that he has overseen at Brookwood include the new Georgia Tech campus at Savannah, the Northern European Headquarters for the Coca-Cola Company in Brussels, Belgium, the Entertainment Channel's large campus for Turner Broadcasting in Atlanta, Grande Stade World Cup Stadium for the government of France, St. Denis, The Wakefield, a luxury high-rise co-op in Atlanta, student housing for Morehouse College, Atlanta, a manufacturing plant for Cisco Systems, Juarez, Mexico, a nationwide branch conversion for Bank of America, and a marketing center and manufacturing plant for Milliken & Co., Yonezawa, Japan.

== The Bridging Method ==
In the early 1980s Heery began developing a new method of project delivery, believing there was a way to retain what he considered the strengths of the traditional Design-Build and Design-Bid-Build methods while eliminating the major disadvantages of those methods, three of which were identified as: an increasing dependence on specialty subcontractors for knowledge on costing (meaning that architects and engineers no longer had the "best" knowledge on costing), the fallacy that construction contract documents will always be free of errors, and an increase in litigation based on disputes.

In a 1993 article in "The Military Engineer" Heery asserted that the primary benefit of this new form of project delivery would be that, by rearranging the roles of architects, engineers and general contractors, it would be possible to provide an owner with a known, lump-sum fixed full construction price at a point in the design and construction sequence approximately midway through the design phases and with the owner having only about half of the design cost at risk while reducing the owner's exposure to contractor-initiated change orders and claims.

Critics in the Construction industry contend that Bridging creates an adversarial relationship between an owner and a contractor due to Bridging's sole focus on low costs and fixed price, eliminating a climate which promotes collaboration between the client and the service provider. The non-relational nature of Bridging can make it a less effective delivery method in an "overheated" construction market, and during those periods of hyperactive growth when contractors, architects and engineers have the ability to pick and choose projects they typically tend to select procedures and methods which move risk away from themselves and onto the owner.

Contractors suggest that the common use of the term Bridging has changed from Heery's original intent and that today it is only meant as a reference to the design criteria used for design-build competitions and is not widely accepted as a project delivery method.

== Affiliations ==
- Fellow of the American Institute of Architects
- Member of the Royal Institute of British Architects
- Fellow of the Construction Management Association of America
- Member of the National Academy of Construction.

== Bibliography ==
=== Non-Fiction ===
- Heery, George (1975). Time, Cost and Architecture. New York: McGraw Hill. ISBN 9780070278158.
- Heery, George (September 2010). Bridging - The Bridging Method of Construction Project Delivery. Lulu.com. p. 228.
