= Woody Hayes Athletic Center =

Indoor athletics training facility

Coordinates: 40°00′44″N 83°01′28″W

The Woody Hayes Athletic Center is an indoor athletics training facility of Ohio State University. It was dedicated in November 1987 in memory of Woody Hayes, Ohio State's football coach, and renovated in a significant expansion in 2005–2007. The facility contains an indoor field which is 400 feet (120 m) long, 220 feet (67 m) wide and 65 feet (20 m) high and is covered by All-Pro Turf. The field is used by the football, baseball, softball, lacrosse and soccer teams.

The $21.5 million 53,000-square-foot (4,900 m^{2}) expansion was financed by fund-raisers outside the athletic department budget. Heery International of Atlanta, Georgia, provided the architectural design, with emphasis on current technological, media, and innovative developments. The WHAC now totals more than 78,000 square feet (7,200 m^{2}) of facilities, offices, and meeting rooms.

The facility has a 17,000-square-foot (1,600 m^{2}) weight room with free weights and Nautilus equipment as well as a training room that is available for Ohio State sports teams.

Football facilities include coaches' offices with individual position meeting rooms, an auditorium for team meetings, meeting rooms for offense and defense units, and a substantial player lounge.

The northern corridor and atrium are adorned with Ohio State Buckeyes football history, including Big Ten and national championship team displays, Heisman Trophies and photos of All-Americans and Academic All-Americans, are no longer open to the public.
