= Fast-track construction =

Project delivery strategy in the construction industry

Fast-track building construction is construction industry jargon for a project delivery strategy to start construction before the design is complete. The purpose is to shorten the time to completion.

== Benefits ==
Shorter schedules are desirable for reasons that vary with building owners. A shorter schedule may reduce a manufacturer's time-to-market, a school district's need to reduce overcrowding or simply provide a new home for a family sooner. Shorter schedules may also reduce the cost of construction financing and reduce overhead costs for the design and construction organizations. Shorter schedules may also reduce the impact of inflation during construction. The fast-tracking of the project is therefore achieved through the integration of design and construction phases.

Fast-track is more difficult to manage than the traditional design–bid–build process. It requires detailed knowledge of the process, effective planning, integrity and close coordination among the organizations executing the work.

== Inherent risks ==
The final cost of the project is uncertain when construction begins because design is not complete. With the traditional design–bid–build process, a complete set of construction documents and specifications describes what the builder agrees to build and serves as the heart of the contract. On fast-track projects, the design, construction documents, and specifications are incomplete, so setting the final cost presents problems. To deal with this difficulty, owners typically use a cost-reimbursable contract with the builder (a construction manager or a general contractor). The contract may include a cost estimate with no guarantee or there may be a Guaranteed Maximum Price (GMP). However, even with a GMP, there can be argument over the scope of work covered by the GMP since the design was incomplete when the contract was executed.

There is also a risk that work built in an early phase of the project may not suit later design decisions. For instance, if the building shape changes after the foundations are built, there is increased cost and delay to modify the completed foundations. An item of equipment that is selected late in the process may require drains or water and power connections that were not anticipated early in the project. Furthermore, the interpretation of the design brief from the contractor may differ from the owner which can result in a conflict of interest.

If time is not crucial, owners may take a prudent approach to finish design and get a fixed lump-sum price before starting construction (the design–bid–build process). However, if there is a reason to speed project delivery, fast-track can be used with any project delivery strategy, such as CM at Risk and Agency CM (see Construction management), design–build, bridging and integrated project delivery. Even the traditional design–bid–build process can use fast-track concepts by bidding separate general construction contracts for phases of the work.

However, many owners choose experienced project teams and consider the rewards to be well worth the risks. One source states that fast-track is used on 40 percent of building projects.

== History of the process ==
For most of the 19th and 20th centuries, the common project delivery process was sequential design–bid–build, with a time period between the completion of one phase and the start of the next one. An architect and/or engineer completed a design, made detailed construction drawings, wrote specifications and invited multiple contractors to submit proposals stipulating their price to execute the project.,

Typically, government organizations preferred a "lump sum" bid for all phases of the work (all off design-build) and were also required to award construction work to the lowest qualified bidder. The political assumption was that the low lump sum bid demonstrated a prudent use of public money, and open competitive bidding demonstrated a fair selection of contractors. Since competitive lump-sum bidding required complete construction drawings and specifications, Fast-track as used in industry was unavailable to public owners.

However, most public procurement regulations allowed procurement of architectural, engineering and other services based on the qualifications of the service provider. (See the Brooks Act for the approach used by the federal government.)

In the 1960s, during the Vietnam War, students enrolled in higher education were deferred from the draft. Consequently, the populations of colleges and universities grew rapidly. Crowding problems were acute because the delivery of design and construction for academic buildings usually took 4 to 6 years. Meanwhile, the high rate of inflation was eroding construction budgets. A 4-5 year project schedule might see the buying power of appropriated funds for building projects reduced significantly.

In 1968, The New York State University Construction Fund (SUCF) retained Caudill Rowlett Scott (CRS) to study ways to shorten schedules. The completed study hypothesized that the SUCF could save 25–45 percent of the time with phased construction. They could stay within their procurement regulations by selecting a company (a CM) for construction management services—who would provide no construction labor or materials—on the basis of qualifications.

The CM would do no actual construction work. The CM would have a professional responsibility to represent the owner's best interest as an agent, similar to that of an architect.

The CM would advise the architect and owner on cost and construction technology during the design phase and would estimate the total cost. The architect would complete the construction drawings and specifications in phases and the CM would take open, competitive bids for those phases of the work, overlapping the design and construction activities. For instance, the CM might take bids for site clearing and grading as soon as the basic building configuration was set and drawings and specifications for that phase of the work were complete. Companies that typically functioned as subcontractors would bid the work. The low bidder would have a direct contract with the owner, metamorphosing from subcontractor to prime contractor. The owner would have multiple prime contracts.

It was not an entirely original concept. There had been a few previous examples of similar processes—Tishman Construction (now part of AECOM) provided Construction Management services for the World Trade Center that was built with phased construction (construction begin in 1966, the building was destroyed September 11, 2001).

SUCF accepted CRS's Fast-track report and retained Smith, Hinchman & Grylls (now the SmithGroupJJR) to implement their first Fast-track project at Stony Brook University, Stony Brook, New York. The Stony Brook project and CRS's later projects demonstrated that the projected time savings were conservative. Sometimes the use of Fast-track and CM reduced time to a third or less of conventional schedules.

The report was titled "Fast-track". Many copies were printed. The concept of a professional construction manager that could implement phased design and construction (Fast-track) for public projects spread rapidly. The United States General Services Administration and many other institutional and government clients throughout the U.S. adopted the process.

However, despite the advantages of a shortened schedule, many owners didn't like the management responsibility for multiple prime construction contracts on a single project and were concerned about the lack of a guaranteed maximum price. In the late 1900s and early 2000s many government organizations changed their procurement regulations to allow the CM to hold the contracts and guarantee price and schedule. To differentiate between the original concept and an additional concept of CM services, the original was called Agency CM and the CM that held the contracts and provided guarantees was called CM at-Risk (see Construction management).

Fast-track is now a common term throughout the US construction industry.

== See also ==
- Building information modeling
