= Cecil and Hermione Alexander House =

Historic house in Georgia, United States

- U.S. National Register of Historic Places
- Location within Metro Atlanta Location within Georgia Location within the United States
- Location: 2232 Mt. Paran Rd, N.W., Atlanta, Georgia
- Coordinates: 33°51′23.05″N 84°26′15.25″W
- Area: 3.68 acres (1.49 ha)
- Architect: Cecil Alexander
- Architectural style: Modern
- NRHP reference No.: 10000116
- Added to NRHP: March 25, 2010

The Cecil and Hermione Alexander House, also known as Shenandoah, in Atlanta, Georgia is a modern, circular plan house designed by, and home for, Atlanta architect Cecil Alexander. The home was featured in Progressive Architecture in 1959 and in Life in 1959 and 1961. One aspect commented on was its supposedly inexpensive cable-suspended plywood roof.

According to the National Park Service:

The Cecil and Hermione Alexander House is a modern house with a circular plan designed by Atlanta architect Cecil Alexander as his family’s residence. Completed in 1957, the house was one of the first modernist houses in Atlanta. The home features curved brick walls, flat roof, and sheet glass walls, and is organized around a central court, while the folded-plate roof floods the interior with light. According to Alexander, the circular plan “is so arranged that the family at least once or twice a day has to get together, just by necessity.”

The building was listed on the U.S. National Register of Historic Places on March 25, 2010. The listing was announced as the featured listing in the National Park Service's weekly list of April 2, 2010.

The central courtyard was originally designed to encircle an old oak tree on the property, but the tree was not in good enough condition to be kept.
