= Atlanta Constitution Building =

Historic building in Atlanta, Georgia

Coordinates: 33.75411°N 84.39265°W

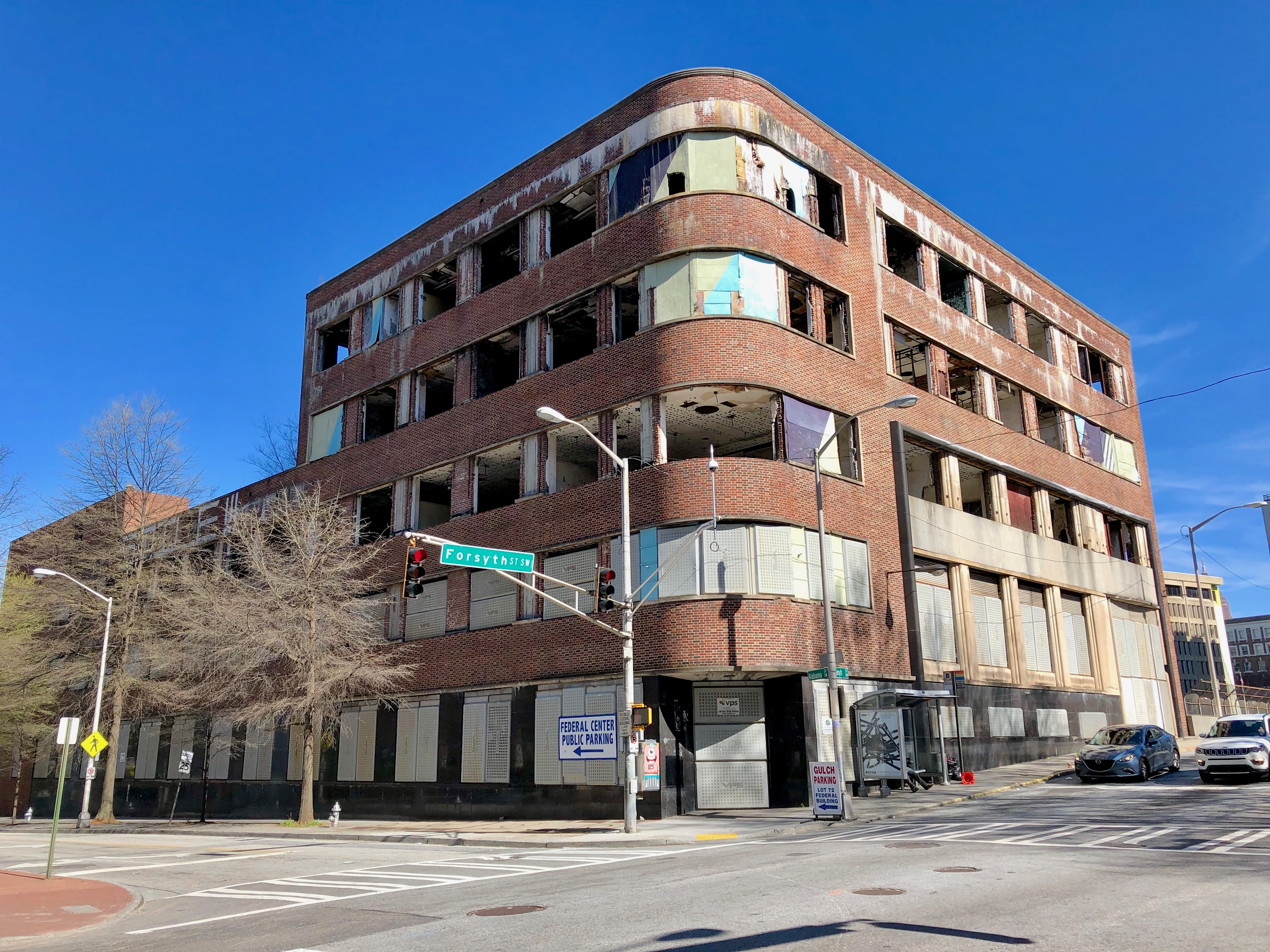
- The Atlanta Constitution Building in 2019

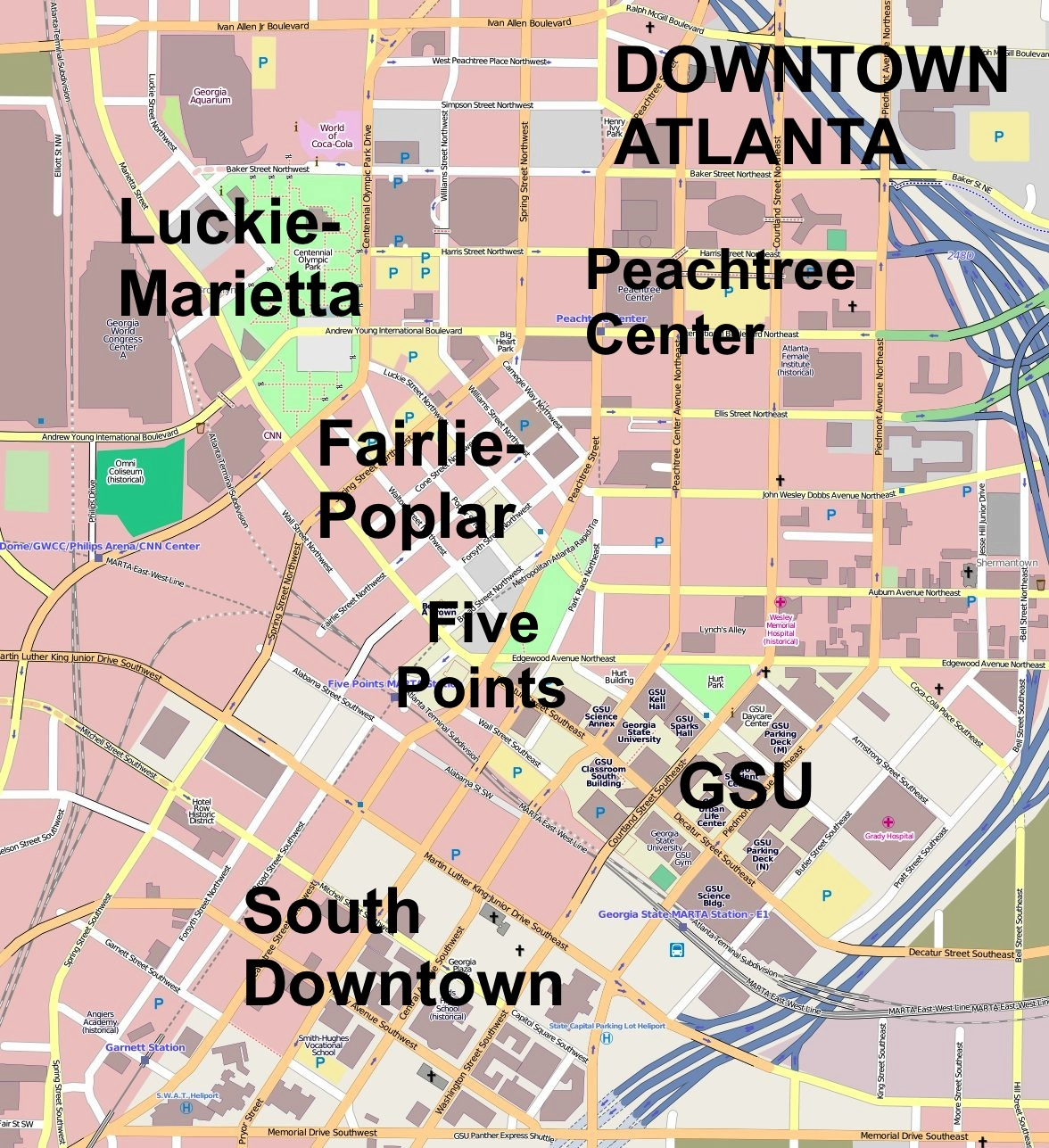
- Location within Downtown Atlanta Location within Atlanta Location within Georgia Location within the United States
- Former names: Georgia Power Atlanta Division Building

General information
- Location: 143 Alabama Street SW Atlanta, GA 30303
- Atlanta Constitution Building
- U.S. National Register of Historic Places
- NRHP reference No.: 100012592
- Added to NRHP: January 21, 2026
- Completed: 1947
- Cost: $3 million

The Atlanta Constitution Building, also known as the Georgia Power Atlanta Division Building, is located at the northwest corner of Alabama and Forsyth Streets in downtown Atlanta, Georgia, at 143 Alabama Street, SW. It is located in an area known as the "Heart of Atlanta" straddling the railroad gulch ("The Gulch"), "due to [its] proximity to the 'Zero Mile Post' which marked both the Southeastern terminus of the Western and Atlantic railroad and the city's earliest settlement". The former Atlanta Constitution Building was designed by Adolph Wittman and was located at the opposite corner of the intersection beginning in 1895. On January 21, 2026, the building was listed on the National Register of Historic Places.

== History ==
The five-story Atlanta Constitution Building was constructed in 1947 and designed by Robert and Company at a cost of $3 million. The building housed the headquarters of the Atlanta Constitution newspaper during tenure of editor Ralph McGill until its consolidation with the Atlanta Journal only three years later, when James C. Cox of the Journal bought the Constitution.

Expenses for the modern plant included “new presses, steel desks, marble corridors and every mechanical contrivance for publishing a modern newspaper in the shortest possible time.” Additionally, WCON, the Constitution's new radio station, was located on the top floor of the building. Retail space occupied the building's sloping base level. Upon moving in, Editor Ralph McGill expressed his desire that the Constitution's prestige should grow to match its new home.

The newspaper subsequently outgrew its building and moved in 1953. There was construction or remodeling undertaken the same year. Georgia Power moved into the building in 1955 until 1960, and many Atlantans paid their electricity bills at this downtown location. Georgia Power moved to its new location on 241 Ralph McGill Boulevard when the building was finished in 1981. The downtown building has been vacant since 1972. The building was placed on the 2003 List of Endangered Buildings by the Buildings Worth Saving Committee of the Atlanta Preservation Center.

== Architectural significance ==
The building is typical of the art moderne movement. Its exterior is composed of Flemish bond brick, marble and limestone. It has a flat terraced roof deck, typical of many structures of the modern movement, curved corners, a "prow-like" end and windows on all floors exude horizontal significance.

Because of its modernism's rarity in Atlanta, it is listed on the National Register of Historic Places due to its architecture under Criterion C and Criterion A because of local significance stemming from Georgia Power's use of the site.

Julian Harris of Georgia Tech sculpted a 72-foot-long (22 m) bas-relief piece depicting the "History of the Press". After the building's abandonment in 1972, the sculpture was moved to the Georgia World Congress station of MARTA. It is located near the escalators of the Centennial Olympic Park Drive entrance.

Another piece, an aluminum and terrazzo medallion depicting the state seal of Georgia which was embedded in the floor of the building's entrance, is currently on display in the entrance of McElreath Hall at the Atlanta History Center.

== Current plans ==
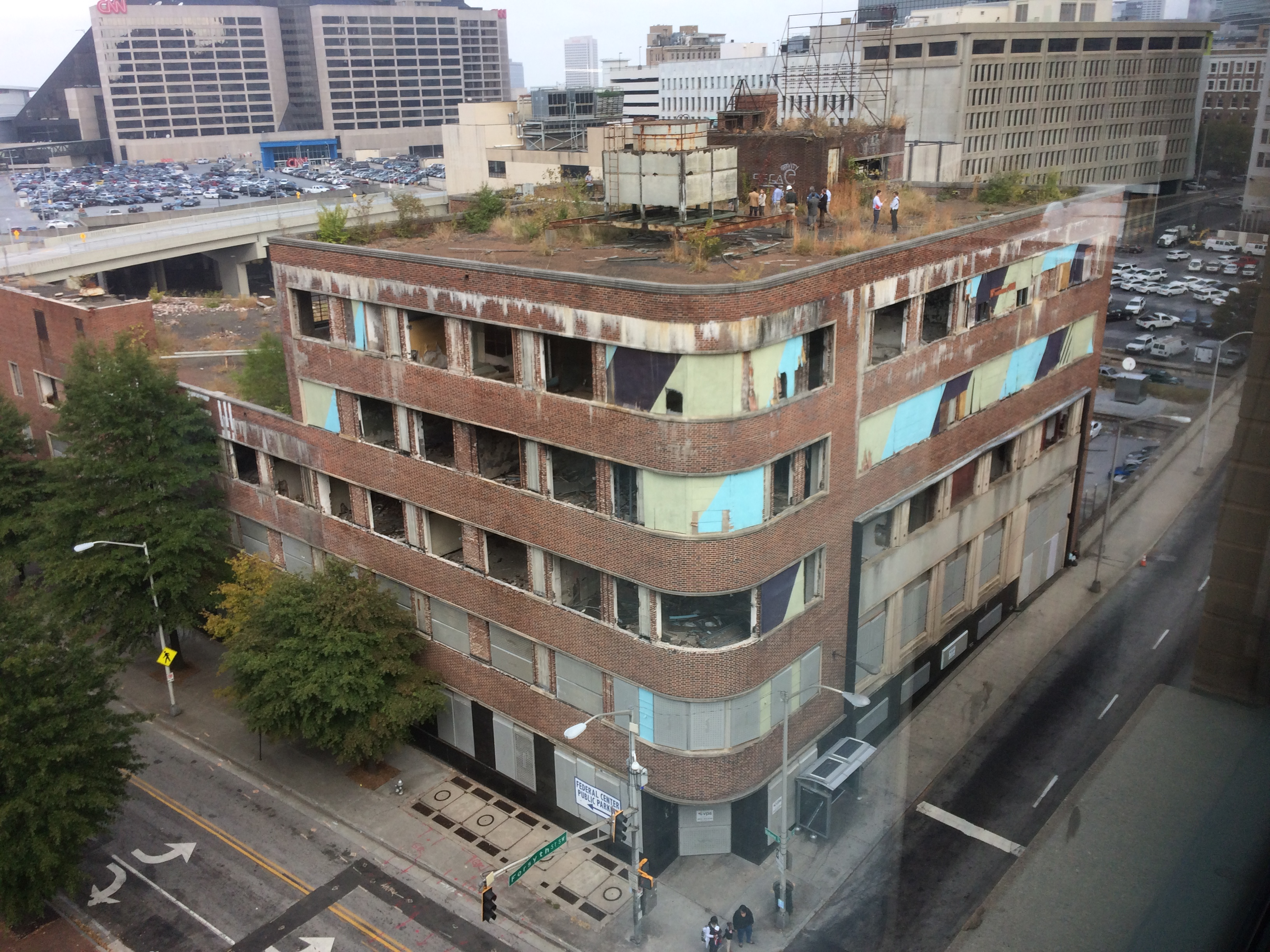
The Atlanta Constitution Building in 2016

The Georgia Department of Transportation is the current owner of the site and has plans to demolish the building and erect a two-story, minimalist steel and glass structure to house the planned Atlanta Multi-Modal Passenger Terminal, also known as the main depot for proposed commuter rail and, possibly someday, high-speed rail, for the region. On July 14, 2010, the Georgia Department of Transportation announced its plans to hire a developer to transform the area. Requests for proposals are due in September and the winning developer will be announced May 2011.

The Atlanta Preservation Center published an article on the Atlanta Constitution Building in its newsletter, Preservation Times:

The APC has been advocating for the city to consider this building as part of its multimodal rail system. Dispossession of this city-owned building was held for consideration in the committee headed by former city council member Clair Muller. The current administration has now released ownership of the building to the DoT.

The review process concerning the proposed demolition of this building was a great concern to the APC, and the National Trust agreed that the process was problematic. Both organizations went on record to protest the manner in which the review had been conducted. The APC's executive director Boyd Coons was called by former city council member Mary Norwood to make statements about the value and possibilities of the building.

The preservation community continues to hope that the building will be saved. It is currently the subject of a study by Tony Rizzuto, associate professor at Southern Polytechnic State University. Rizzuto, who is also chairman of the Midtown Land Use Committee and sits on the developmental review committee of DRC, SPI 16, is looking into how the building can be utilized as part of the rail transportation program being developed.

The building has become a gathering place for many of downtown Atlanta's homeless population during cold weather. On Tuesday, March 26, 2013, several downtown streets were blocked as firefighters doused a blaze at the site. The fire broke out shortly before 8 a.m. No injuries were reported.

In 2017, the building was sold to a developer with plans to renovate it into office space and low-cost housing.

As of 2024, Invest Atlanta, the city’s economic development arm, intends to ink a deal with Wisconsin-based affordable housing developer Gorman & Company to turn the Atlanta Constitution Building property at 143 Alabama St. into nearly 200 apartments and retail called Folio House.
