= Rosser International =

Rosser International was an architectural and engineering firm formed from the acquisition of FABRAP by the Atlanta engineering firm Rosser White Hobbs Davidson McClellan Kelly. The firm ceased operations around June 2019, amid a civil lawsuit for failing to complete a $111-million jail project.

== Buildings ==
- Memphis Pyramid
- AT&T Midtown Center
- Turner Field
- Arena at Gwinnett Center
- Petersen Events Center
- Verizon Arena
- United Spirit Arena
- Rhoads Stadium
- Joan C. Edwards Stadium
- Bud Walton Arena
- Colonial Life Arena
