= Roman L. Weil =

American economist

Roman Lee Weil Jr. (May 22, 1940 – February 1, 2023) was an American economist, accountant, consultant, and emeritus faculty member of Booth School of Business at the University of Chicago, especially known for his work on bond duration.

== Biography ==
Roman L. Weil was born in 1940 in Montgomery, Alabama, to Roman L. Weil Sr. and Charlotte Alexander Weil (the sister of architect Cecil Alexander). He graduated from Sidney Lanier High School in Montgomery in 1958. Weil obtained in 1962 his BA in economics and mathematics from Yale University, in 1965 his MA in industrial administration, and in 1966 his PhD in economics both at the 1966 from the Tepper School of Business at Carnegie Mellon University. In 1973 he became a Certified Public Accountant, and in 1974 a Certified Management Accountant.

Weil started his academic career at the Booth School of Business in 1965, and worked there until his retirement in 2008. Since then he taught at Princeton University and the University of California, San Diego. Weil also served on several boards.

== Selected publications ==
- Weil, Roman L. Handbook of modern accounting. Ed. Sidney Davidson. McGraw-Hill, 1977.
- Davidson, Sidney, Clyde P. Stickney, and Roman L. Weil. Financial accounting: An introduction to concepts, methods, and uses. Dryden Press, 1979.
- Davidson, Sidney, Clyde P. Stickney, and Roman L. Weil. Accounting: The language of business. (1987).

Articles, a selection:

- Fisher, Lawrence, and Roman L. Weil. "Coping with the risk of interest-rate fluctuations: returns to bondholders from naive and optimal strategies." Journal of Business (1971): 408–431.
- Weil, Roman L. "Macaulay's duration: An appreciation." Journal of Business (1973): 589–592.
- Ingersoll, Jonathan E., Jeffrey Skelton, and Roman L. Weil. "Duration forty years later." Journal of Financial and Quantitative Analysis 13.04 (1978): 627–650.
