= Tower Square (Atlanta) =

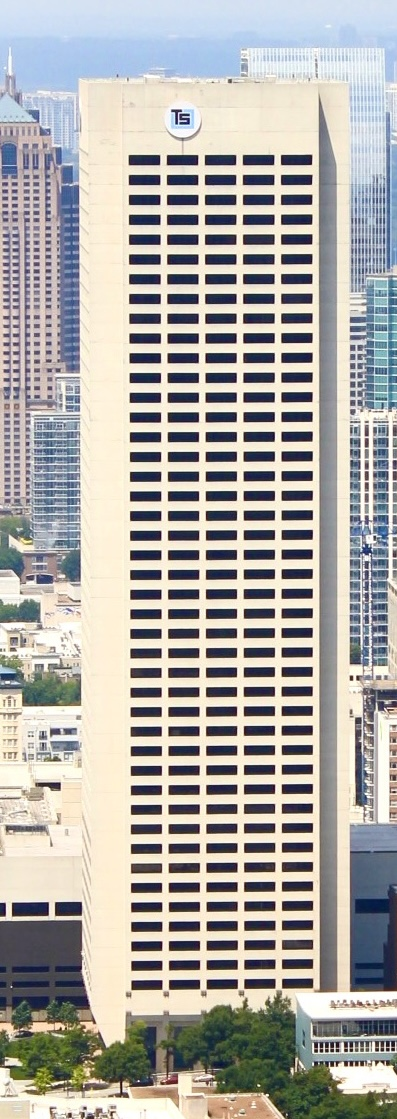
- Tower Square as viewed from the Westin Peachtree Plaza in 2024.

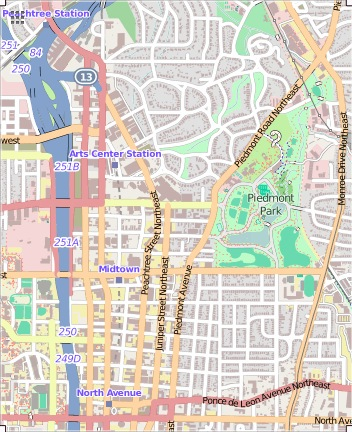
- Location within Atlanta Midtown Tower Square (Atlanta) (Atlanta) Tower Square (Atlanta) (Georgia) Tower Square (Atlanta) (the United States)
- Former names: BellSouth Building; Southern Bell Telephone Building; AT&T Midtown Center I

General information
- Location: 675 W Peachtree St NW; Atlanta, GA 30308
- Coordinates: 33.77268°N 84.38692°W
- Completed: 1980

Height
- Roof: 206.4 m (677 ft)

Technical details
- Floor count: 47

Design and construction
- Architects: Skidmore, Owings & Merrill; FABRAP
- Engineer: Weidlinger Associates

Website
- tower-square-2f18.brandcast.io

Tower Square (formerly known as BellSouth Center, Southern Bell Center, and AT&T Midtown Center I) is a 206.4 m (677 ft), 47-story skyscraper located in Midtown Atlanta Georgia. Completed in 1982, it served as the regional headquarters of BellSouth Telecommunications, which does business as AT&T Southeast, and was acquired as part of AT&T's acquisition of BellSouth. BellSouth Corporate headquarters was located in the Campanile building, also in Midtown. By 2020, AT&T had vacated its offices.

== Background ==
The company, then called Southern Bell, originally planned to build the parking deck for the tower one block further east at the corner of Ponce de Leon Avenue and Peachtree Street. This would have required the razing of the historic Fox Theatre which would have been an especially great loss to the city after the downtown Loew's Grand Theatre was destroyed by fire in 1978. Tremendous opposition, protests, fundraising, and petition drives within the community prevented the Fox's demolition. Even Liberace spoke out on behalf of the "Fabulous Fox". In the end, a complicated deal was struck to build the parking deck on an alternate site north of the main tower on West Peachtree Street.

The building has a direct entrance to the North Avenue MARTA Station, which is located at the southern end of the complex and was built concurrently with the building. In 1992, Southern Bell merged into BellSouth, and the tower was renamed the BellSouth Center. In 2002, BellSouth completed construction of two additional mid-rise buildings adjacent to the tower to form its BellSouth Midtown Center campus as part of its effort to consolidate office space around mass transit stations.

The architects who designed the tower were Skidmore, Owings & Merrill and Rosser International, Inc. The general contractor for its construction was Beers Skanska, Inc. The building also served as a filming location for the 1993 science fiction action film RoboCop 3, in which it was used as the setting for the headquarters of the evil mega-corporation O.C.P, the main antagonist organization in the RoboCop trilogy.

Following AT&T's acquisition of BellSouth in 2006, the complex was rebranded as the AT&T Midtown Center. In August 2008, Icahn Enterprises, a firm led by billionaire Carl Ichahn, acquired the complex from AT&T in a sale-leaseback transaction. In 2019, following AT&T's decision to vacate the property, the owner announced a major renovation and re-branding to "Tower Square." It was subsequently renamed in October 2020 as part of an effort to transition the property from a single-tenant utility facility into a multi-tenant hub.

In May 2026, Oxos, a medical imaging company, signed a 40,000-square-foot lease to move its headquarters to Tower Square, becoming the first office tenant to move into the building since AT&T fully vacated it. The building had been completely vacant for over five years.

== See also ==
- Architecture of Atlanta
- List of tallest buildings in Atlanta
