= Atlanta–Fulton County Stadium =

Former stadium in Atlanta, Georgia, United States

- The Launching Pad; The House that Aaron Built
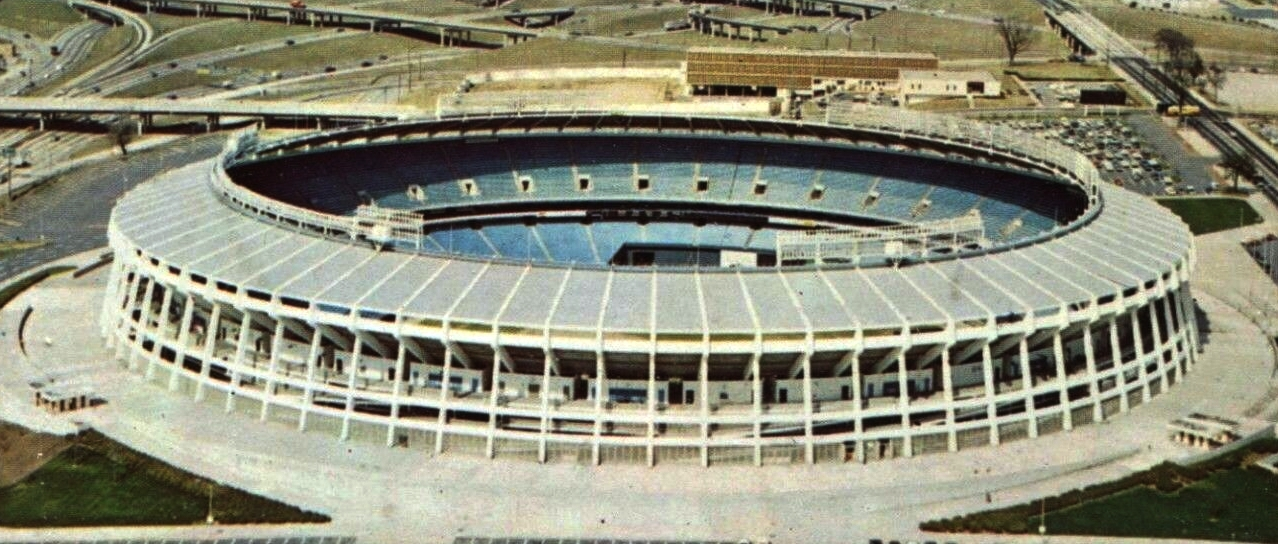
- circa late 1960s-early 1970s
- Interactive map of Atlanta–Fulton County Stadium
- Former names: Atlanta Stadium (1965–1975)
- Location: 521 Capitol Avenue SE; Atlanta, Georgia, U.S.
- Coordinates: 33.739°N 84.389°W
- Owner: City of Atlanta and Fulton County
- Operator: City of Atlanta and Fulton County
- Capacity: Baseball: 52,007; Football: 60,606
- Surface: Natural grass
- Field size: 1966–68 & 1974–96; Left field – 330 ft (101 m); Left-Center – 385 ft (117 m); Center Field – 402 ft (123 m); Right-Center – 385 ft (117 m); Right Field – 330 ft (101 m) 1969–1972; Left field – 330 ft (101 m); Left-Center – 375 ft (114 m); Center Field – 402 ft (123 m); Right-Center – 375 ft (114 m); Right Field – 330 ft (101 m) 1973; Left field – 330 ft (101 m); Left-Center – 375 ft (114 m); Center Field – 402 ft (123 m); Right-Center – 385 ft (117 m); Right Field – 330 ft (101 m)

Construction
- Groundbreaking: April 15, 1964; 62 years ago
- Opened: April 9, 1965; 61 years ago
- Closed: October 24, 1996; 30 years ago
- Demolished: August 2, 1997; 29 years ago
- Cost: US$18 million ($184 million in 2025)
- Architects: Heery & Heery; FABRAP
- Structural engineers: Prybyloski & Gravino
- Services engineers: Lazenby & Borum
- General contractor: Thompson-Street Co.

Tenants
- Atlanta Crackers (IL) (1965); Atlanta Braves (MLB) (1966–96); Atlanta Falcons (NFL) (1966–91); Atlanta Chiefs (NASL) (1967–69, 1971–72, 1979–81); Peach Bowl (NCAA) (1971–92)

Atlanta–Fulton County Stadium, often referred to as Fulton County Stadium and originally named Atlanta Stadium, was a multi-purpose stadium located in Atlanta, Georgia. The stadium was home of the Atlanta Braves of Major League Baseball (MLB) from 1966 until 1996 and the Atlanta Falcons of the National Football League (NFL) from 1966 until 1991. It was built to attract an MLB team and in 1966 succeeded when the Milwaukee Braves relocated from Wisconsin.

The Braves and expansion Falcons shared the venue for 26 years, until the Falcons moved into the newly completed Georgia Dome in 1992. The Braves continued to play at the stadium for another five years, then moved into Turner Field in 1997, the converted Centennial Olympic Stadium built for the previous year's Summer Olympics. Atlanta–Fulton County Stadium hosted baseball events. Atlanta–Fulton County Stadium was demolished on August 2, 1997.

== History ==
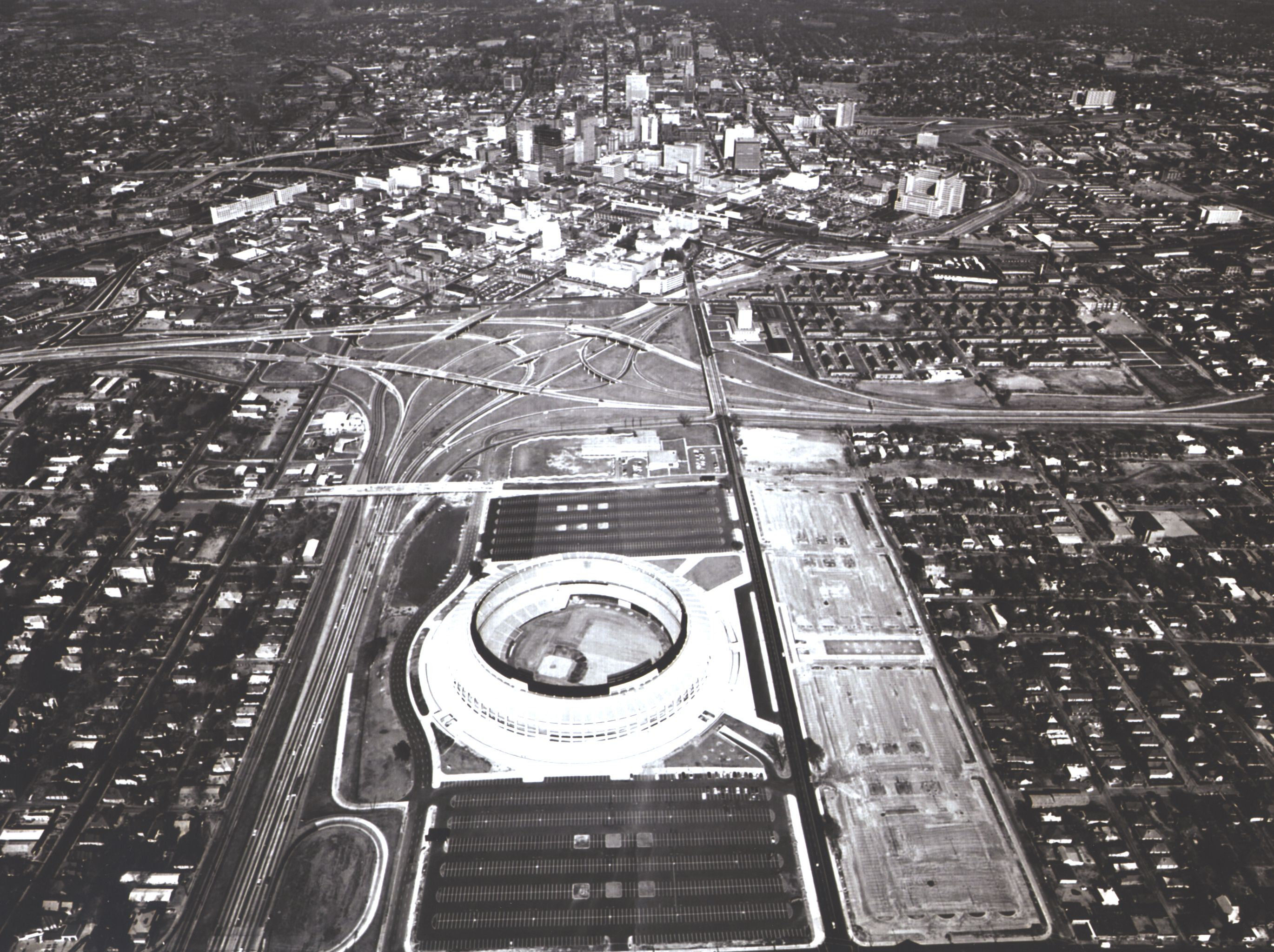
Aerial view of the stadium with the Atlanta skyline and the Interstate 20/75 interchange

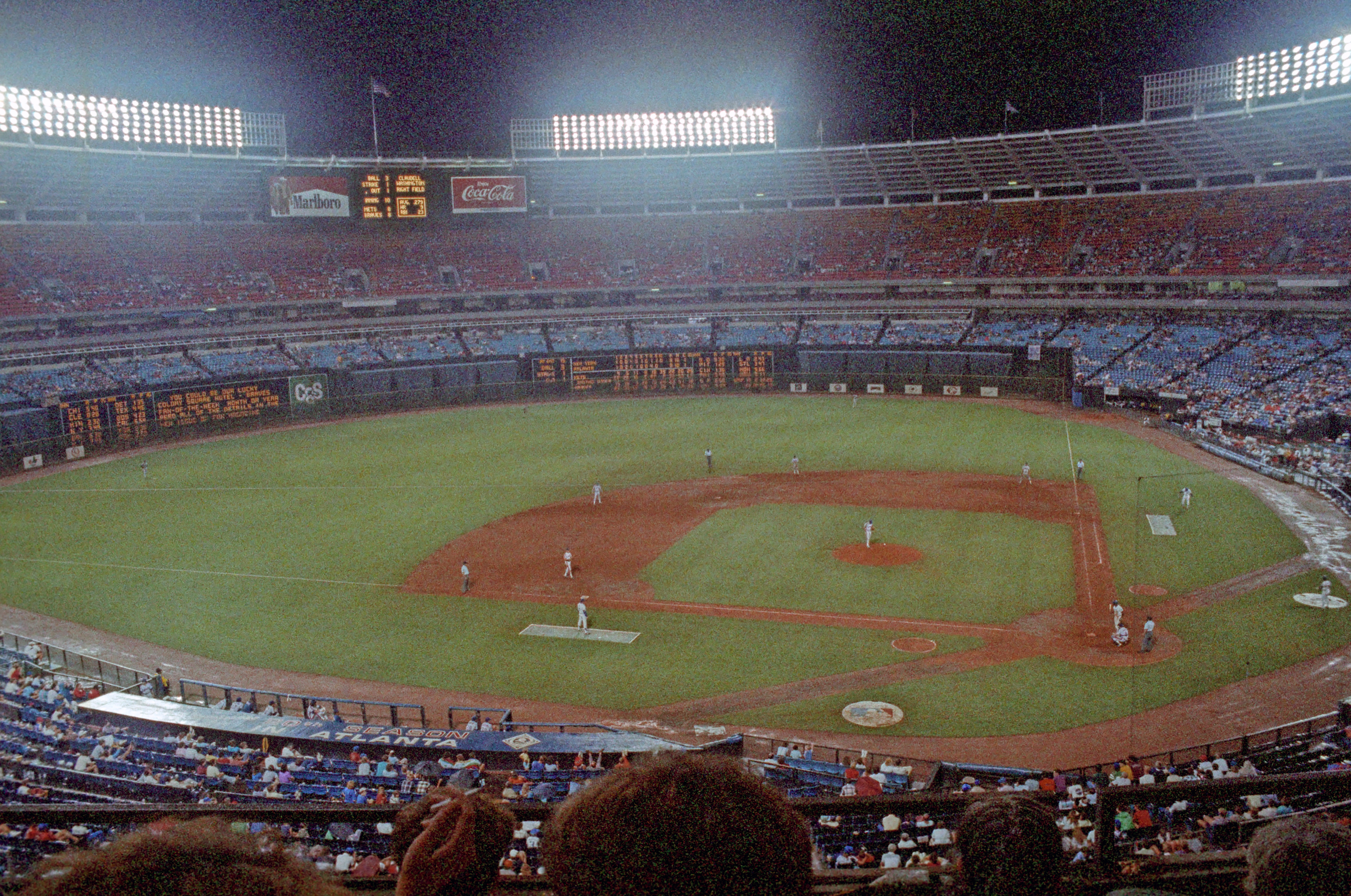
Atlanta–Fulton County Stadium in July 1985

During his 1961 campaign for mayor of Atlanta, Ivan Allen Jr. promised to build a sports facility to attract a Major League Baseball team. After winning office, Allen chose a 47-acre (19 ha) plot in the Washington–Rawson neighborhood for the building site, citing its proximity to the state capitol, downtown businesses, and major highways. Allen and The Atlanta Journal sports editor Furman Bisher attempted to persuade Charlie Finley, owner of the Kansas City Athletics, to move his team to Atlanta. Finley was receptive and began discussing stadium design plans with Allen. However, the deal ended in July 1963 when the American League did not approve the move.

In 1964, Mayor Allen announced that an unidentified team had given him a verbal commitment to move to Atlanta, provided a stadium was in place by 1966. Soon afterward, the prospective team was revealed to be the Milwaukee Braves, who announced in October that they intended to move to Atlanta for the 1965 season. However, court battles kept the Braves in Milwaukee for one last season.

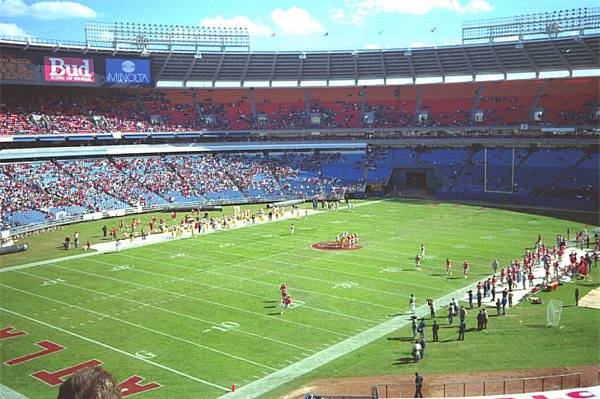
Atlanta–Fulton County Stadium during a Falcons game, 1991

The new stadium was built on the site of the cleared Washington–Rawson neighborhood, which a half-century before had been a wealthy neighborhood home to Georgia's governor, among others, but which by the 1960s had fallen on hard times. Forty-seven dignitaries took part in a groundbreaking ceremony on April 15, 1964, and that November, the Braves signed a 25-year agreement to play there, beginning in 1966. Construction was completed on April 9, 1965, for $18 million, and that night the Milwaukee Braves and Detroit Tigers played an exhibition game in the stadium. During that year the International League's Atlanta Crackers, whose previous home had been Ponce de Leon Park, played their final season in Atlanta Stadium. On August 18, 1965, the Beatles performed a concert at Atlanta Stadium.

In 1966, both the National League's transplanted Braves and the National Football League's Atlanta Falcons, an expansion team, began to use the facilities. In 1967, the Atlanta Chiefs of the National Professional Soccer League (re-formed as the North American Soccer League in 1968) began the first of five seasons played at the stadium. The venue hosted the second match of the NASL Final 1968 and two matches of the NASL Final 1971.

On February 11, 1975, the stadium's name was changed to the compound Atlanta–Fulton County Stadium after the county threatened to withdraw its financial support. However, the official website of the Atlanta Braves maintains that the name change occurred after Ted Turner purchased the team in 1976.

The Falcons moved to the Georgia Dome in 1992, while the Braves remained until Centennial Olympic Stadium from the 1996 Summer Olympics was converted into Turner Field, which was completed just prior to the start of the 1997 season. The stadium sat 60,606 for football and 52,007 for baseball. The baseball competition for the 1996 Summer Olympics was held at Atlanta–Fulton County Stadium while the Braves were on a three-week road trip.

=== Demolition ===
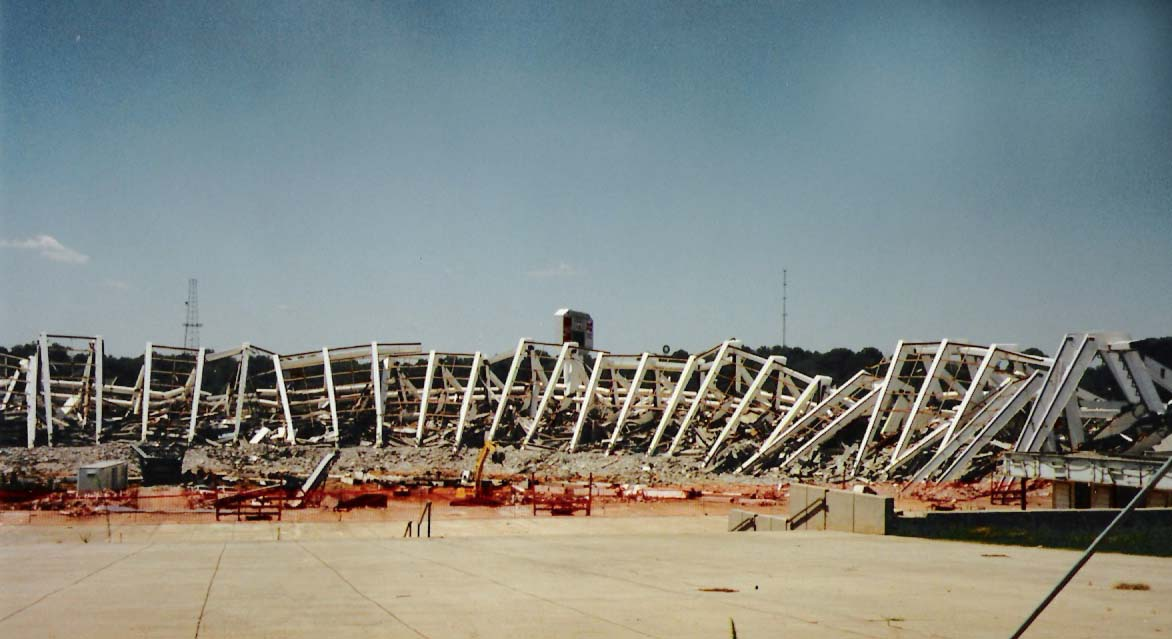
Atlanta–Fulton County Stadium being demolished after implosion circa 1997

Following the Olympics and the 1996 World Series, Fulton County commissioner, Marvin S. Arrington Sr., wanted to preserve the stadium as the home of a future Major League Soccer franchise and share the parking facilities between it and Turner Field but he was unable to push it through.

On April 4, 1997, home plate was removed from Atlanta–Fulton County Stadium and taken to Turner Field, where it was installed by Hank Aaron in the new stadium. Afterwards, demolition of the old stadium began. Between spring and summer 1997, the inside of the stadium was demolished. The stadium was imploded on August 2, 1997; the remains were later removed and demolished. A parking lot, built for Turner Field now stands on the site, with an outline of the old stadium built in. The monument that marked the landing point of Hank Aaron's historic 715th home run stands in the same place it did when the stadium was on the site.

The outfield fence was donated to the Georgia State Baseball Complex and installed prior to the 1998 season.

Gallery of the former Atlanta–Fulton County Stadium site as a parking lot (1998-2025)

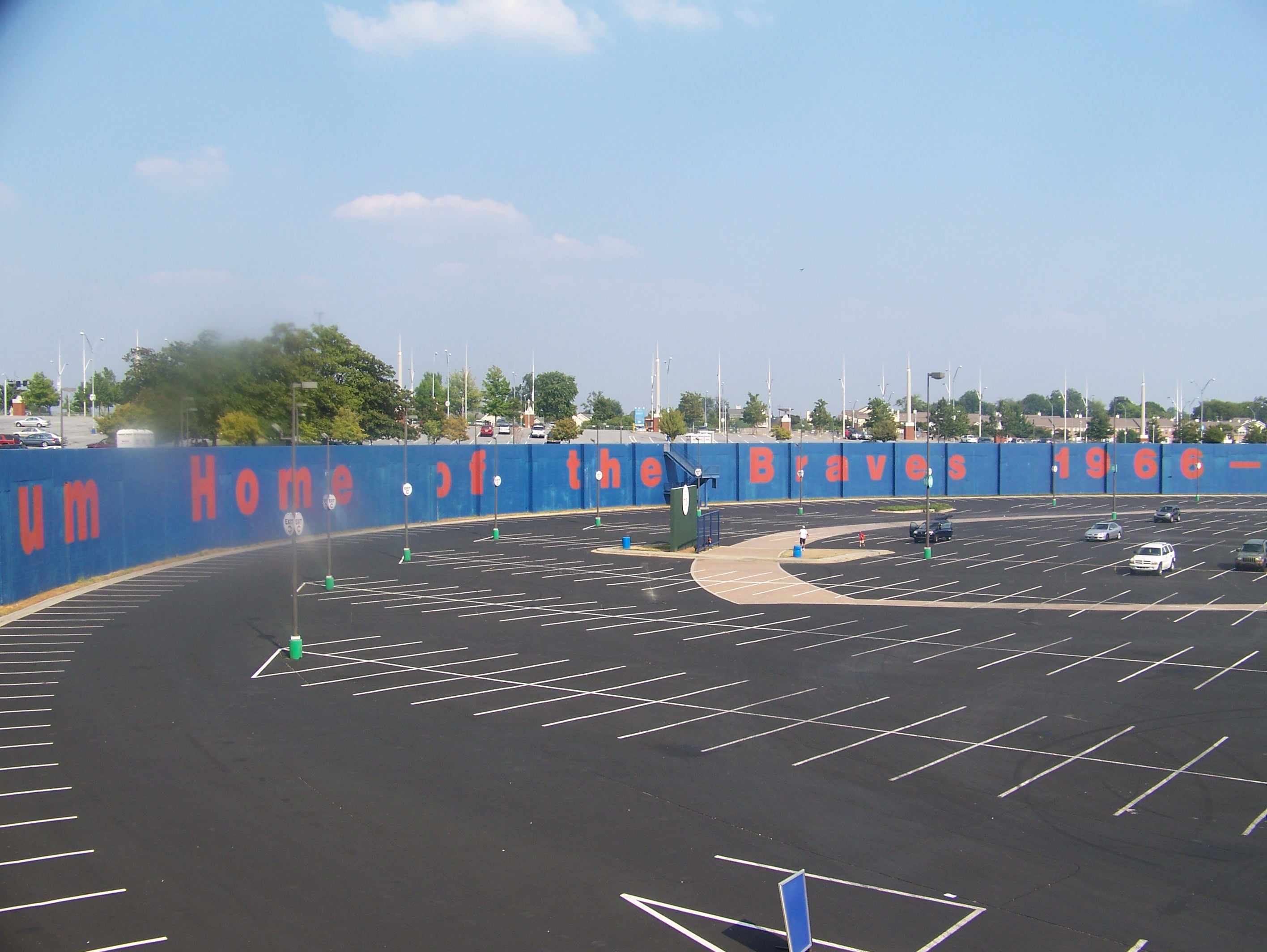
The site where Atlanta–Fulton County Stadium once stood as parking lot for then-Turner Field

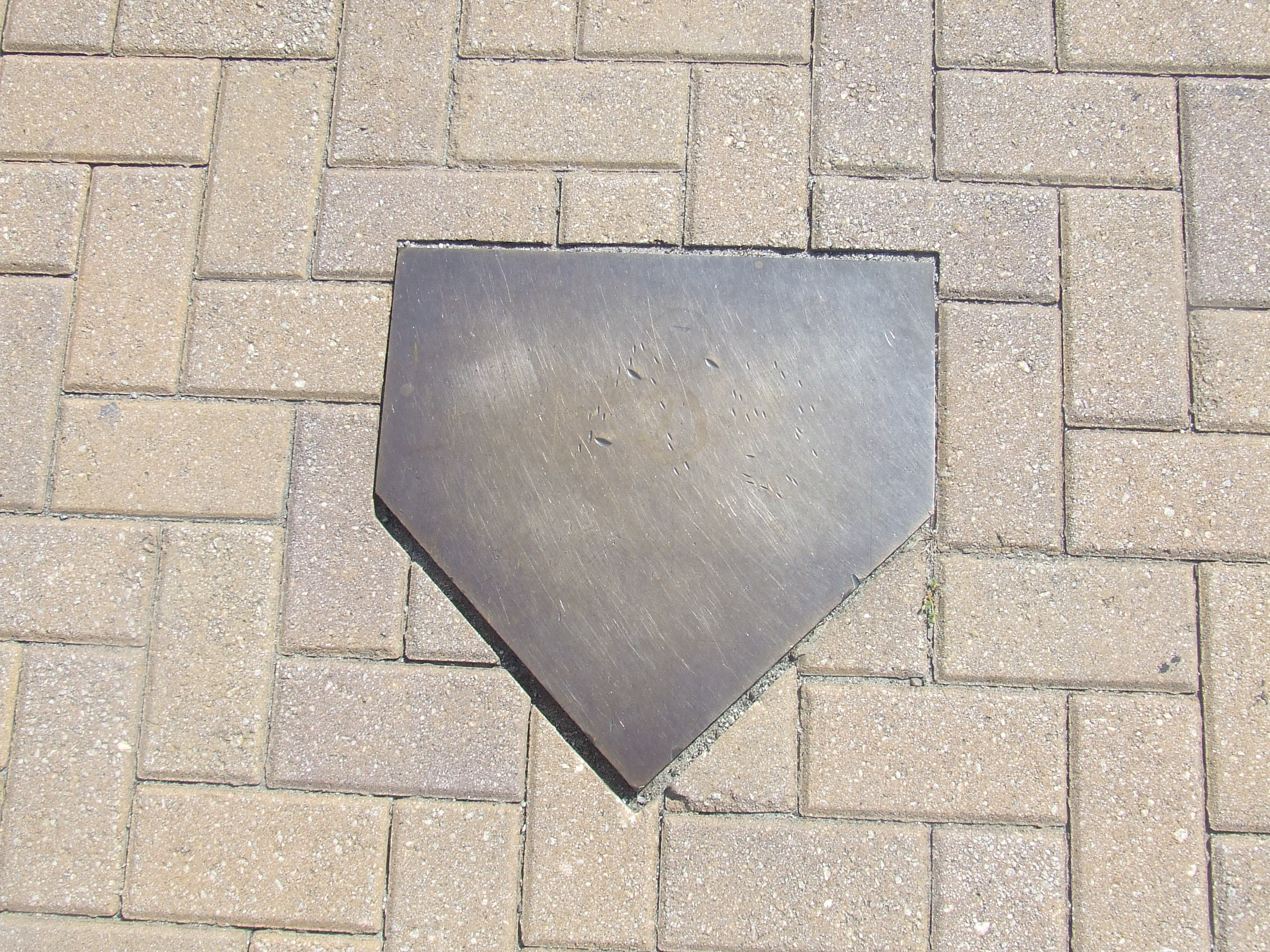
Plaque commemorating the location of Atlanta–Fulton County Stadium's home plate

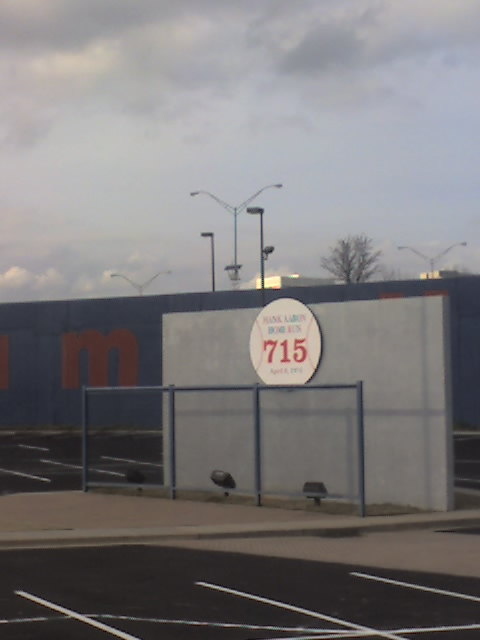
The fence and wall display in the center of the picture commemorates the spot at which Hank Aaron's 715th home run landed on April 8, 1974

View of then-Turner Field from the site where Atlanta–Fulton County Stadium once stood

=== Redevelopment ===
Upon the Atlanta Braves' move to Truist Park in suburban Cobb County after the 2016 season, the stadium site and the adjacent Turner Field were purchased by Georgia State University in 2016, with final approval from the Board of Regents of the University System of Georgia on November 9 of that year. Turner Field was renovated into Center Parc Stadium for the Panthers football team, while new baseball and softball parks are planned for the former Atlanta–Fulton County Stadium site. In May 2024, The Board of Regents of the University System of Georgia approved the construction of a new baseball stadium on the site, with the diamond located in and dimensions the same as the former stadium, with completion planned in time for the start of the 2026 season.

The site served a parking lot for Center Parc Stadium until construction of the new GSU baseball stadium began in December 2025. The outfield fence from the Georgia State Baseball Complex will be installed into the new venue in their original location, along with building of a new exterior wall, restoring the outfield and dimensions to its pre-1997 appearance. The Hank Aaron statue from Center Parc Credit Union Stadium will also be moved to the new baseball stadium's main entrance. It is due to be completed by fall 2026. On May 14, 2026, GSU officially designated the new facility as Chastain Childers Field at Bill and Susan Reeves Stadium, though the shortened form Reeves Stadium will also be used.

== Notable events ==
=== Baseball ===
- On April 12, 1966, Joe Torre hit the first major league home run in the history of Atlanta Stadium.
- On July 25, 1972, the stadium hosted the Major League Baseball All-Star Game. Hank Aaron hit a home run during the game, and the National League won it, 4–3, in 10 innings.
- On April 8, 1974, Hank Aaron became baseball's all-time career home run leader by hitting his 715th home run off the Los Angeles Dodgers' Al Downing.
- 1984 Braves–Padres bean brawl: During a series between the Braves and the San Diego Padres, one game spawned several brawls between the two teams. On August 12, 1984, Braves pitcher Pascual Pérez hit the Padres' Alan Wiggins with a pitch; Wiggins did not charge the mound, but the Padres vowed revenge on Pérez for his actions (several Padres were ejected in their subsequent attempts to hit Pérez). When Pérez was finally hit, by a pitch thrown by the Padres' Craig Lefferts, the first of many bench-clearing brawls began. By the time the game was over, both teams' lineups had been nearly emptied (due to all the ejections on both sides).
- On July 6, 1986, Bob Horner became the eleventh player in Major League Baseball history to hit four home runs in a single game.
- The stadium hosted the World Series for the first time in 1991 when the Braves played the Minnesota Twins in what ESPN judged to be the best World Series ever played. The Braves won all three games played in Atlanta, two in their final at-bat, but lost the series in seven games.
- The 1992 World Series saw the Braves play the Toronto Blue Jays with the Blue Jays defeating the Braves four games to two, including two of three in Atlanta.
- On July 20, 1993, a fire occurred in the stadium press box during batting practice for that evening's game against the St. Louis Cardinals. This fire occurred on the same day Fred McGriff joined the Braves.
- On October 10, 1995, the Braves clinched the 1995 NLDS the 1st team to win a Division Series since the NLDS format in the playoff system began that same year. They defeated the Colorado Rockies 3 games to 1, with the decisive win at home.
- On October 28, 1995, the Braves clinched the 1995 World Series by defeating the Cleveland Indians, 1–0, on a one-hit, 8-inning performance by pitcher Tom Glavine. The title was the Braves' first World Series championship in Atlanta, making one title in each of the three cities in which they have resided (also Boston and Milwaukee).
- September 23, 1996, marked the stadium's final regular season game as the Braves played host to the Montreal Expos. Atlanta won the game 3–1 and clinched the NL Eastern Division title in the process.
- The stadium's final event was Game 5 of the 1996 World Series, when the Braves played host to the New York Yankees. The final score was 1–0 in favor of the Yankees, with the ballpark's final run scored by Charlie Hayes. The final ceremonial first pitch was thrown to Eddie Perez by former President Jimmy Carter, who had done the honors at Braves home openers while still Governor of Georgia. The winning pitcher was New York's Andy Pettitte, defeating the Braves' John Smoltz. The final hit was recorded by Atlanta's Chipper Jones, who doubled off Pettitte in the bottom of the ninth inning. Pinch-hitter Luis Polonia was the final out in Fulton County Stadium's history, hitting a deep fly ball to right-center field caught by Yankees right fielder Paul O'Neill, which gave the stadium's final save to John Wetteland. (Since no home runs were hit in that game the final home run in the stadium's history belongs to Jim Leyritz, who hit a 3-run home run in Game 4. Leyritz was also Pettitte's batterymate for Game 5.)

For the 1996 summer Olympics, the stadium was the primary venue for baseball.

=== Football ===
- The Pittsburgh Steelers and Minnesota Vikings played the first NFL preseason game on August 14, 1965.
- On September 11, 1966, the Atlanta Falcons played their first game in the stadium and lost to the Los Angeles Rams 19–14.
- The Falcons' last game played at the stadium was on December 15, 1991, where they defeated the Seattle Seahawks 26–13, clinching a NFC wild-card spot for the team's first playoff berth since 1982; among some of the attendees included Wayne Newton and MC Hammer.

=== Concerts ===
Date	Artist	Opening act(s)	Tour / Concert name	Attendance	Revenue	Notes
August 18, 1965	The Beatles	King Curtis; Cannibal and the Headhunters; Brenda Holloway; Sounds Incorporated	1965 US Tour	—	—	This is the band's only concert in Atlanta.
May 4, 1973	Led Zeppelin	—	1973 North American Tour	49,233	—	It was estimated that of the 49,233 people in attendance, about 16,000 of them sat on the field making it the largest single musical performance in the history of the state.
September 22, 1973	Elton John	Sutherland Brothers & Quiver	Goodbye Yellow Brick Road Tour	—	—	
August 5, 1974	Marvin Gaye	-	Let's Get It On Tour	-	-	
June 5, 1976	ZZ Top	Marshall Tucker Band; Elvin Bishop	Worldwide Texas Tour	45,000 / 65,000	$425,000	
August 29, 1976	Kiss	Bob Seger & the Silver Bullet Band; Johnny & Edgar Winter; Blue Öyster Cult; 38 Special	Destroyer Tour	—	—	
October 26 & 27, 1984	The Jacksons		Victory Tour	61,000	$1,960,000	
October 20, 1988	George Michael	The Bangles	Faith World Tour	—	—	

=== Other events ===
- In February 1966 Vietnam War supporters held a prayer rally that featured Dean Rusk as its keynote speaker.
- In October 1968, the stadium hosted a World Cup qualifying match between the United States and Canada, finishing 1-0 to the hosts.
- The stadium hosted a round of the AMA Supercross Championship 1977–1986 and 1989–1992.
- In 1994, the UniverSoul Circus conducted its first performance at the stadium.

== Layout ==
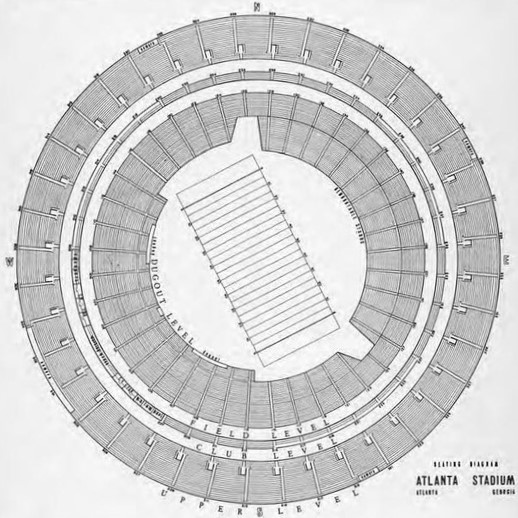
The layout used for football games

The stadium was relatively nondescript, one of the many multi-purpose stadiums built during the 1960s and 1970s, similar to Veterans Stadium, RFK Stadium, the Astrodome, Three Rivers Stadium, Busch Memorial Stadium, Oakland–Alameda County Coliseum and Riverfront Stadium.

As was the case for every stadium that used this design concept, the fundamentally different sizes and shapes of baseball and football fields made it inadequate for both sports. In the baseball configuration, 70% of the seats were in foul territory. In the football configuration, seats on the 50-yard-line—normally prime seats for football—were more than 50 yards (46 m) away from the sidelines. One unusual feature of this stadium is the fact that, unlike most multi-purpose stadiums – where the football field was laid either parallel to one of the foul lines or running from home plate to center field – the football field here was laid along a line running between first and third base. Oakland–Alameda County Coliseum has a similar configuration. Thus, a seat behind home plate for baseball would also be on the 50-yard line for football. The stadium was refurbished for the 1996 season prior to hosting the Olympic baseball competition.

Unlike similarly designed outdoor stadiums—such as Riverfront Stadium and Busch Memorial Stadium—Fulton County Stadium always had a natural grass surface. However, for many years it was notorious for its poor field conditions. Until 1989, it didn't have full-time groundskeepers. Instead, it was tended to by a municipal street-maintenance crew.

Due to the elevation of the Atlanta area (situated at the foothills of the Appalachian Mountains), the stadium boasted the highest elevation in baseball when it opened, at 1,050 feet (320 m) above sea level. It retained this distinction for 27 seasons, until the expansion Colorado Rockies entered the National League in 1993. The high elevation and the Southern summer heat made it favorable to home run hitters, resulting in the nickname "The Launching Pad." Until the Florida Marlins arrived (also in 1993), the stadium was the hottest in the majors.

Fulton County Stadium was designed by a joint-venture team of FABRAP (Finch Alexander Barnes Rothschild & Paschal) and Heery, Inc.

== Seating capacity ==
Baseball
Years	Capacity
1965	51,500
1966–1967	50,893
1968–1971	51,383
1972–1973	52,744
1974–1975	52,870
1976–1978	51,556
1979–1981	52,194
1982	52,785
1983–1984	52,934
1985	53,046
1986	52,006
1987–1989	52,003
1990–1991	52,007
1992–1994	52,013
1995	52,710
1996	52,769

Football
Years	Capacity
1965–1966	56,891
1967–1976	58,850
1977	60,489
1978–1984	60,763
1985–1986	59,709
1987–1991	59,643

Events and tenants
Preceded by First stadium	Home of the Atlanta Falcons; 1966–1991	Succeeded by Georgia Dome
Preceded by Milwaukee County Stadium	Home of the Atlanta Braves; 1966–1996	Succeeded by Turner Field
Preceded by Grant Field	Home of the Peach Bowl; 1971–1991	Succeeded by Georgia Dome
Preceded by Tiger Stadium	Host of the All-Star Game; 1972	Succeeded by Royals Stadium
