= Heery International =

American architecture and construction management firm

CBRE | Heery
- Company type: Public
- Industry: Architecture, Engineering, Program Management, & Construction Management
- Founded: 1952
- Founder: George T. Heery; C. Wilmer Heery
- Parent: CBRE Group

CBRE | Heery, formerly known as Heery International, Inc., was founded in 1952 by George T. Heery and his father C. Wilmer Heery Jr., and is a full-service architecture, interior design, engineering, construction management, program management, and commissioning firm with over 500 employees located in 19 offices across the United States.

CBRE | Heery touches on a variety of industries and project types, providing design, engineering and construction services. Its focus markets include aviation, corporate/private, K-12 education, government, healthcare, higher education, justice and sports.

== History ==
In 1952, George Heery entered private practice by joining with his architect father, C. Wilmer Heery Jr., who had an established firm in Athens, Georgia. Together, George and his father formed Heery and Heery, with Wilmer Heery continuing to practice in Athens, Georgia, and George leading the Atlanta office. Early projects included residential, light commercial, governmental and industrial.

During the late 1950s, founder George Heery developed a set of combined architectural, engineering and project management procedures for greatly accelerating design and construction for industrial projects and a decade later he and a small group of professionals developed the concept of Construction Program Management for the purpose of controlling time and cost on behalf of the owner in construction programs.

By the 1980s the firm had grown and changed names to Heery International and Heery was chairman, CEO and the largest shareholder of the largest program management, architectural and engineering firm in the Southeast with over 500 employees. Over a 17-year span, from the mid-1960s to the early 1980s, George Heery oversaw an expansion the firm's vision and capabilities. Milestones of that expansion include:

- 1965: The firm, in association with the architectural firm of Finch, Alexander, Barnes, Rothschild, and Pascal (FABRAP), designed and managed the construction of the Atlanta–Fulton County Stadium in less than one year. Later the association became known as Heery-FABRAP, which carried out the design and construction management for over 100 major stadiums and arenas, as well as the Central Station for Atlanta's MARTA system.
- 1966: The purchase of an interior design firm that became Heery Interiors.
- 1967: The formation of Heery Program Management providing construction program management services.
- 1969: Heery Graphics is formed.
- 1970: The acquisition of the mechanical engineering firm of J. W. Austin, which when added to the firm's existing in-house electrical and structural engineering departments, became Heery Engineering.
- 1975: Time, Cost, and Architecture, written by many members of Heery staff, is published and cited by Engineering News Record Magazine as "The first definitive work on construction management".
- 1976: Heery opens offices in London and Frankfurt in addition to offices already existing in Baltimore, San Diego, Los Angeles, New York and Amman, Jordan.
- 1978: Heery Energy Consultants is formed.
- 1982: Heery Land Planning is formed to provide civil engineering and landscape architecture
- 1986: George Heery and the other shareholders at Heery International sold the company to British Insulated Callender's Cables (BICC), a publicly traded British Company, later known as Balfour Beatty. Heery was required by the sale to continue as CEO until March 1989.

In October 2017, commercial real estate services and investment firm CBRE Group, Inc. (NYSE: CBG) announced a definitive agreement to acquire Heery International, Inc. from Balfour Beatty LLC.

== Buildings ==
- Allen E. Paulson Stadium, Georgia Southern University (Statesboro, Georgia)
- Stead Family Children's Hospital (Iowa City, Iowa)
- Miami International Airport North Terminal Development (Miami, Florida)
- Harrell Medical Education Building (University of Florida, Gainesville, Florida)
- Home Depot Corporate Headquarters (Atlanta, Georgia)
- Oak Ridge National Laboratory East Campus Complex (Oak Ridge, Tennessee)
- Oak Ridge National Laboratory Leadership Computing Facility (Oak Ridge, Tennessee)
- United States Diplomacy Center (Washington, DC)
- Franklin High School Historic Renovation (Portland, Oregon)
- Lincoln High School Historic Renovation (Seattle, Washington)
- General Services Administration 1800 F Headquarters (Washington, DC)
- West Hollywood City Hall Automated Garage and Community Plaza (West Hollywood, California)
- Intercontinental Exchange, Inc. Headquarters (Atlanta, Georgia)
- Nippert Stadium Expansion (University of Cincinnati, Cincinnati, Ohio)
- Georgia State University Stadium (Georgia State University, Atlanta, Georgia)
- Bob Ford Field (University at Albany, New York)
- 999 Peachtree (Atlanta)
- Monarch Tower (Atlanta)
- One Atlantic Center (Atlanta)
- Georgia Dome (Atlanta)
- Turner Field (Atlanta)
- Frank Erwin Center (Austin, TX)
- USA Baseball National Training Complex (Cary, North Carolina)
- Woody Hayes Athletic Center (Ohio State University, Columbus, Ohio)
- M. M. Roberts Stadium (University of Southern Mississippi, Hattiesburg, Mississippi)
- UPMC Park (Erie, Pennsylvania)
