= Samuel Washington Woodhouse =

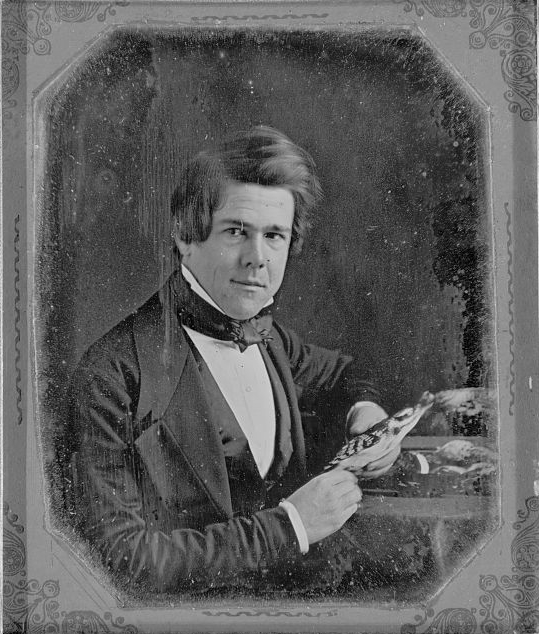
- 1847 daguerreotype
- Born: June 27, 1821; Philadelphia, U.S.
- Died: October 23, 1904; Philadelphia, U.S.
- Scientific career
- Fields: Natural history

Samuel Washington Woodhouse (June 27, 1821 – October 23, 1904) was an American surgeon, explorer and naturalist.

Woodhouse was doctor and naturalist on the Sitgreaves Expedition led by Captain Lorenzo Sitgreaves from San Antonio to San Diego which explored the possibility of a route from the Zuni River to the Pacific. He was the author of A Naturalist in Indian Territory: The Journal of S. W. Woodhouse, 1849-50. Woodhouse's toad (Anaxyrus woodhousii) and Woodhouse's scrub jay (Aphelocoma woodhouseii) were named in his honor. The first Cassin's sparrow was described in 1852 by Samuel W. Woodhouse from a specimen collected near San Antonio, Texas. Dr. Woodhouse gave it its species name in honor of John Cassin, a Philadelphia ornithologist.

== Notes ==
=== References ===
- Woodhouse, S.W., edited and annotated by Andrew Wallace and Richard H. Hevly, From Texas to San Diego in 1851: The Overland Journal of Dr. S.W. Woodhouse, Surgeon-Naturalist of the Sitgreaves Expedition, Texas Tech University Press (2007), hardcover, 358 pages, ISBN 978-0-89672-597-3
  - The original is a manuscript in the manuscript collections of the Academy of Natural Sciences of Philadelphia, Diary of an Expedition Down the Zuni and Colorado Rivers under Captain L. Sitgreaves 1851-52, 4 volumes, item 387B
