= John Eisenmann =

American architect (1851–1924)

- Born: 26 March 1851; Detroit, Michigan
- Died: 6 January 1924 (aged 72)
- Education: University of Michigan; University of Stuttgart
- Occupation: Architect
- Practice: Eisenmann & Smith
- Buildings: Arcade
- Design: Flag of Ohio

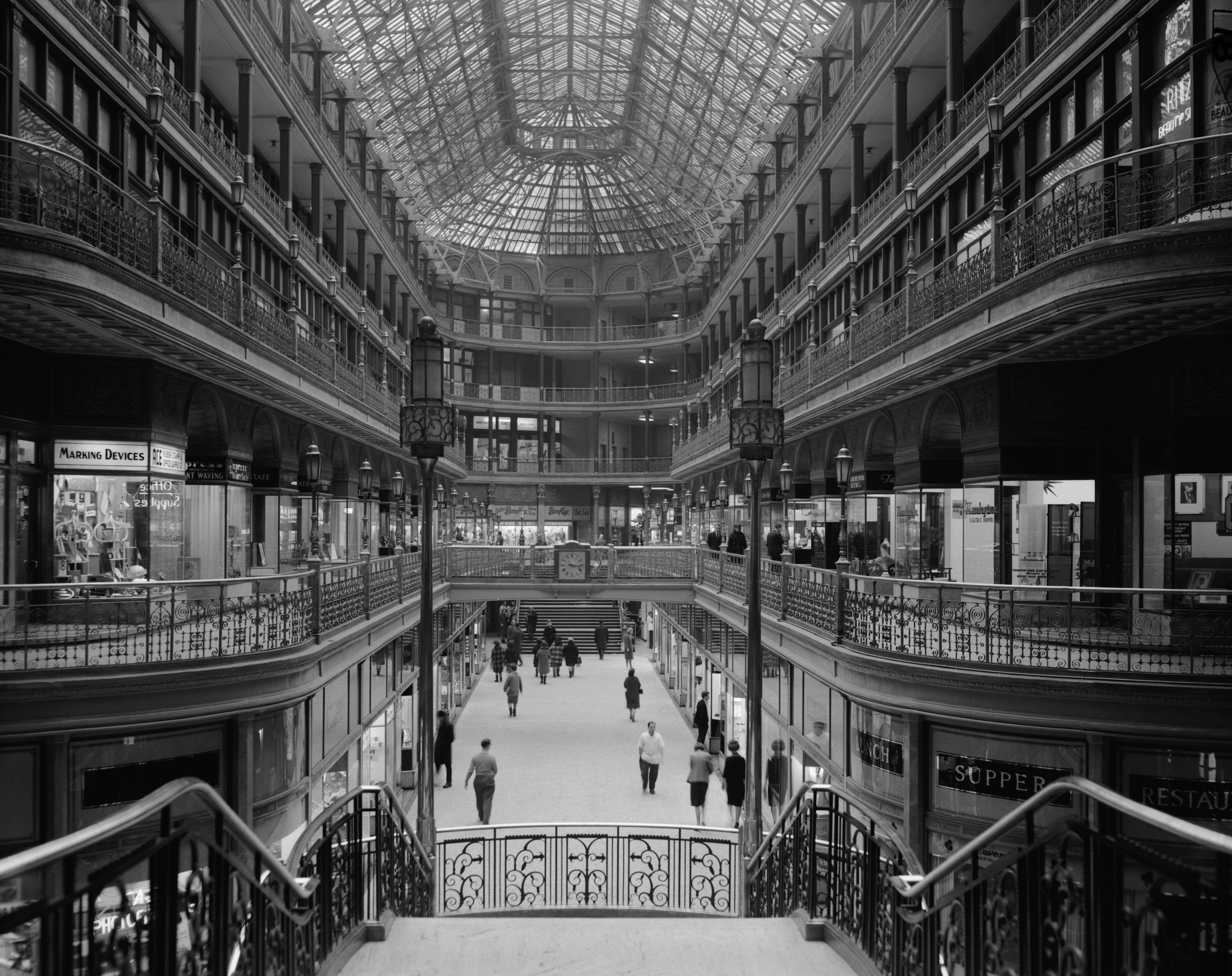
Interior of The Arcade in downtown Cleveland (1966)

John Eisenmann (March 26, 1851 – January 6, 1924) was an architect in Cleveland, Ohio. As part of Eisenmann & Smith he designed the Cleveland Arcade in downtown Cleveland. He also designed the Main building for Case School of Applied Science, present-day Case Western Reserve University, where he was also the school's first professor of civil engineering. He pioneered structural steel construction in the United States and is credited with co-designing Cleveland's Arcade, "the first commercial building in the state designated an historic landmark in architecture." Eisenmann is also credited with designing the flag of Ohio in 1901.

== Early life ==
Eisenmann was born March 26, 1851, in Detroit, Michigan, to Christian W. and Mary A. (Schubert) Eisenmann. He graduated from Monroe High School in Michigan. In 1871, he graduated from the University of Michigan with a degree in Civil Engineering, and was a member of the Xi Chapter of the Zeta Psi fraternity. From 1871 to 1875, Eisenmann worked as an assistant engineer for the United States Lake Survey for the Great Lakes. He then went to Europe to study architecture, studying first at the Royal School of Technology of Munich, Germany 1875–1876, graduating from the Technical School of Stuttgart, Germany, in 1877. From 1878 to 1879, he returned working for the United States Lake Survey. From 1879 to 1882, he then worked for the Mississippi River Commission.

On April 5, 1882, John Eisenmann married Annie M. Theising.

== Arcade ==
Construction of The Arcade, 1889

The arcade was erected in 1890, at a cost of $867,000. It opened on Memorial Day (May 31, 1890) and is an example of Victorian architecture, consisting of two nine-story buildings joined by a five-story arcade. It includes a glass skylight spanning 300 feet (91 m) along the four balconies.

The arcade is identified as the first indoor shopping mall in the United States. and was built by Detroit Bridge Co., run by Stephen V. Harkness. It is one of the few remaining arcades of its kind in the United States. Modeled after the Galleria Vittorio Emanuele II located in Milan, the Arcade comprises two nine-story towers with a skylight, 100 feet (30 m) high, made of 1,800 panes of glass spanning over 300 feet (91 m). The construction was financed by John D. Rockefeller, Marcus Hanna, Charles F. Brush and several other wealthy Clevelanders of the day. The Arcade was modified in 1939, with remodeling of the Euclid Avenue entrance and some structural supports added.

The Arcade is a cross between a lighted court and a commercial shopping street, composed of three structures: two nine-story office buildings facing out to Euclid and Superior Avenues, connected via the five-story iron-and-glass-enclosed arcade. The Richardsonian arched entrance along Superior Avenue is original but the Euclid Avenue front was remodeled in 1939 by the firm of Walker and Weeks.

Vertical lines of the columns rise nearly 100 feet (33 m) to the glass roof and create a spacious domed interior. In 2001, the Hyatt corporation redeveloped the Arcade into Cleveland's first Hyatt Regency hotel. The Hyatt Regency occupies the two towers and the top three floors of the atrium area. The two lower floors of the atrium area remain open to the public with retail merchants and a food court. In addition, the Hyatt's lobby and offices are located near the Superior Avenue entrance.

== Projects ==
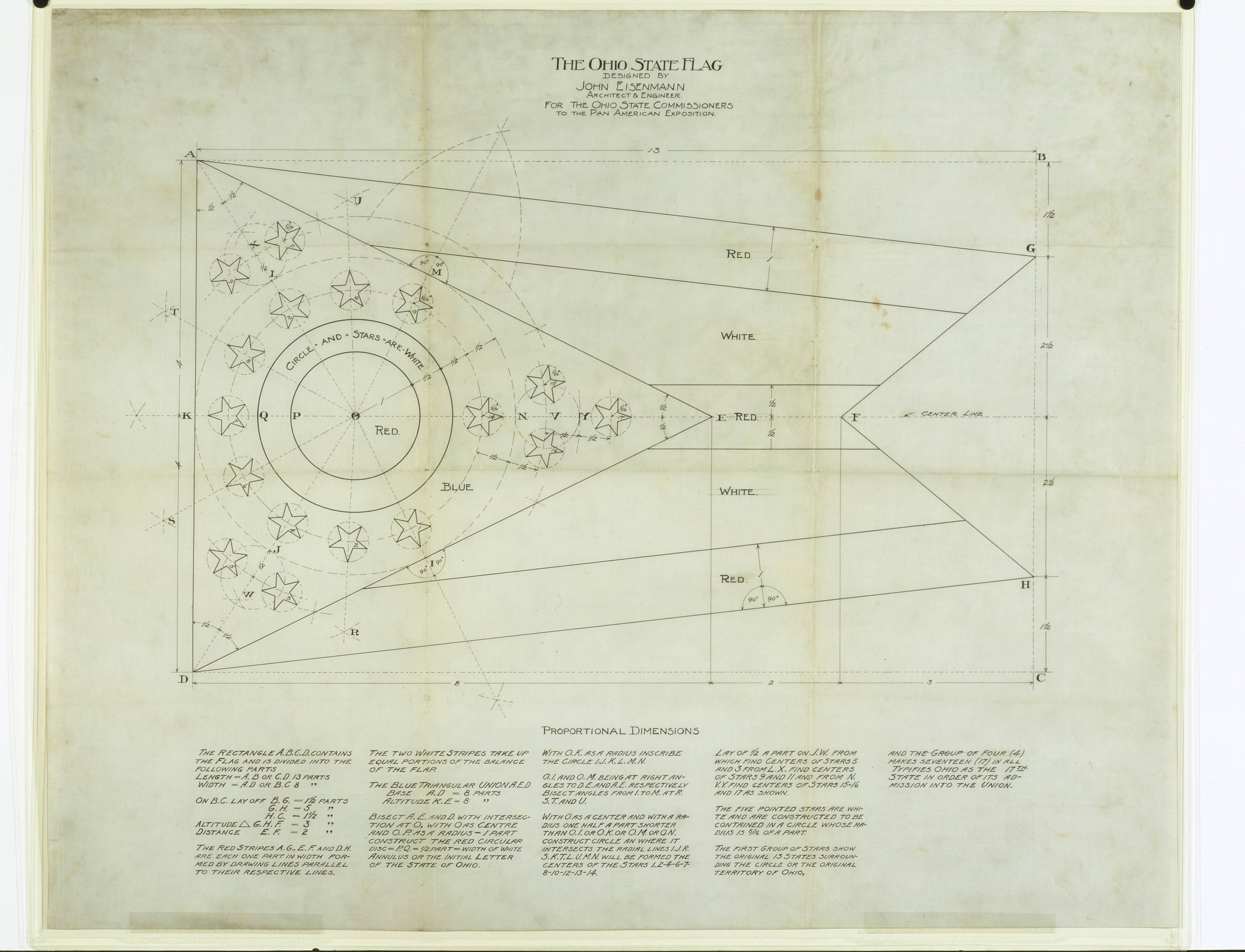
Eisenmann's original specification for the flag of Ohio, which he created to adorn the Ohio Building at the Pan-American Exposition

- Cleveland Arcade with Eisenmann & Smith
- Case Main Building (1885), Case School of Applied Science in University Circle
- Cinecraft Productions (1898) (Cleveland Public Library West Side Branch - Carnegie System), 2515 Franklin Boulevard in Ohio City.
- Esmond Apartment Building (1898), 4806 Euclid Ave.
- Ohio Building at the 1901 Pan-American Exposition
