= Thomas J. Cram =

American topographical engineer (1804–1883)

Thomas Jefferson Cram
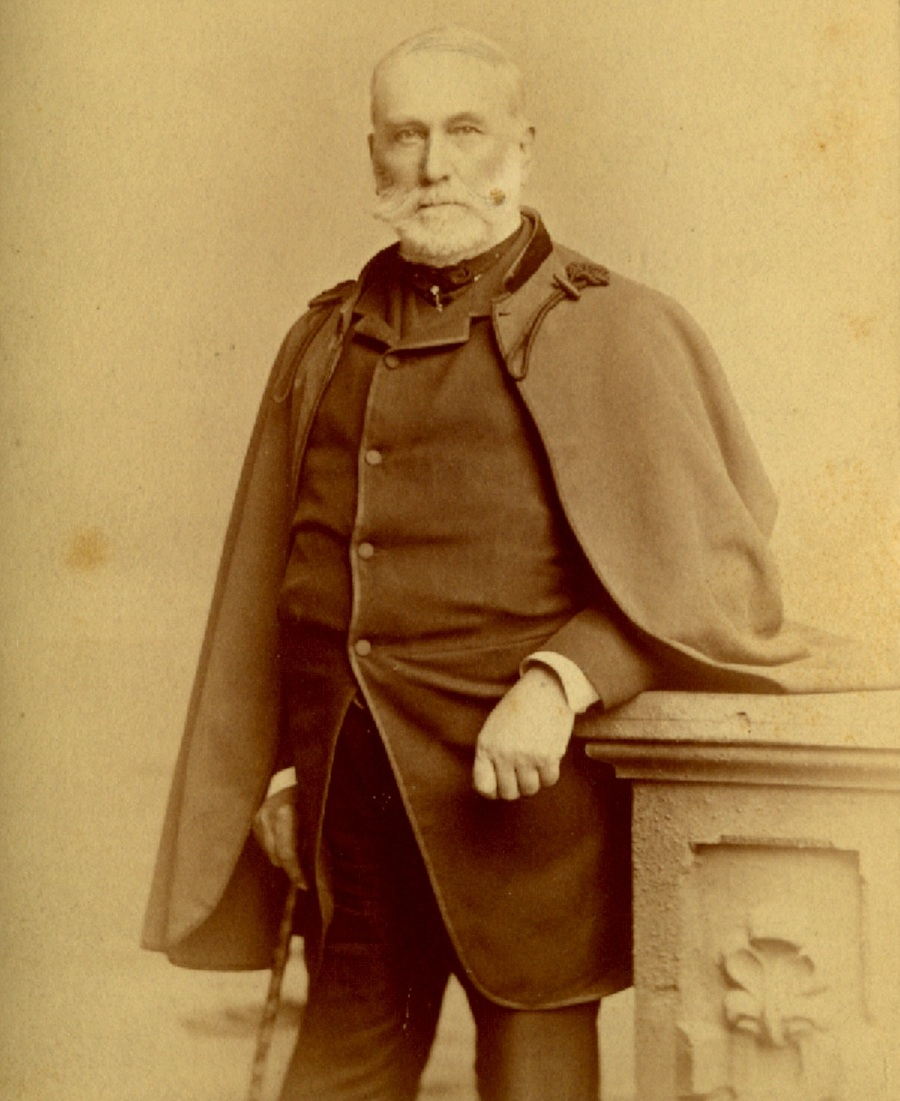
- Born: March 1, 1804; Acworth, New Hampshire, U.S.
- Died: December 20, 1883 (aged 79); Philadelphia, Pennsylvania, U.S.
- Resting place: Laurel Hill Cemetery, Philadelphia, Pennsylvania, U.S.
- Occupations: Topographical Engineer
- Military career
- Allegiance: United States of America; Union
- Branch: United States Army; Union Army
- Service years: 1826–1836, 1838-1869
- Rank: Colonel; Brevet Major General
- Unit: United States Army Corps of Engineers
- Conflicts: Mexican–American War; American Civil War
- Known for: General Superintendent of harbor works on Lake Michigan and roads in Wisconsin Territory; Michigan and Wisconsin Territory boundary survey; United States Lake Survey; Oregon and Washington Territory Survey; United States Coast Survey for New England and North Carolina

Thomas Jefferson Cram (March 1, 1804 – December 20, 1883) was an American topographical engineer from New Hampshire who served in the United States Army Corps of Topographical Engineers from 1839 to 1863 and the United States Army Corps of Engineers from 1863 to 1869.

Cram served as general superintendent for harbor works on Lake Michigan and the construction of roads in Wisconsin Territory. He led surveys to determine the border of Michigan and Wisconsin Territory in the Upper Peninsula, to explore Oregon and Washington Territories, and to determine the feasibility of a water route to the Pacific Ocean through Central America. He served under Major General Zachary Taylor in the Army of Occupation during the Mexican-American War and conducted coastal and river surveys in Texas.

Cram participated in the United States Lake Survey and led the survey section between Green Bay, Wisconsin, and Chicago, Illinois. He conducted multiple river, canal, and harbor improvement assessments including for the Fox and Wisconsin Rivers in Wisconsin, the Ohio River in Louisville, Kentucky, and the harbor at St. Louis, Missouri, on the Mississippi River. He assisted the United States Coast Survey in New England from 1847 to 1855 and in North Carolina from 1858 to 1861.

During the American Civil War (1861–1865), Cram was promoted to lieutenant colonel and colonel and served as aide-de-camp to Major General John E. Wool.

== Biography ==
Cram was born in Acworth, New Hampshire. He graduated from the United States Military Academy in 1826 and taught mathematics and natural and experimental philosophy at the Academy from 1829 to 1836. He was commissioned a second lieutenant in the 4th U.S. Artillery Regiment. In 1835 he was promoted to first lieutenant, and he resigned his commission in 1836.

Cram worked as an assistant engineer for the railroad industry in Maryland and Pennsylvania for two years and returned to United States Army service as a captain in 1838. In 1839, he was assigned as the general superintendent for harbor works in Lake Michigan and road construction in Wisconsin Territory with Howard Stansbury and Lorenzo Sitgreaves assigned to assist him. He made improvements to the harbors of Chicago, Illinois, St. Joseph, Michigan, and Michigan City, Indiana, and built new harbors at Calumet in Illinois and at Kenosha, Milwaukee, and Racine, Wisconsin. He built seven roads in Wisconsin and used timber truss bridges designed by Stephen Long for all bridge spans greater than 20 feet (6.1 m) in length.

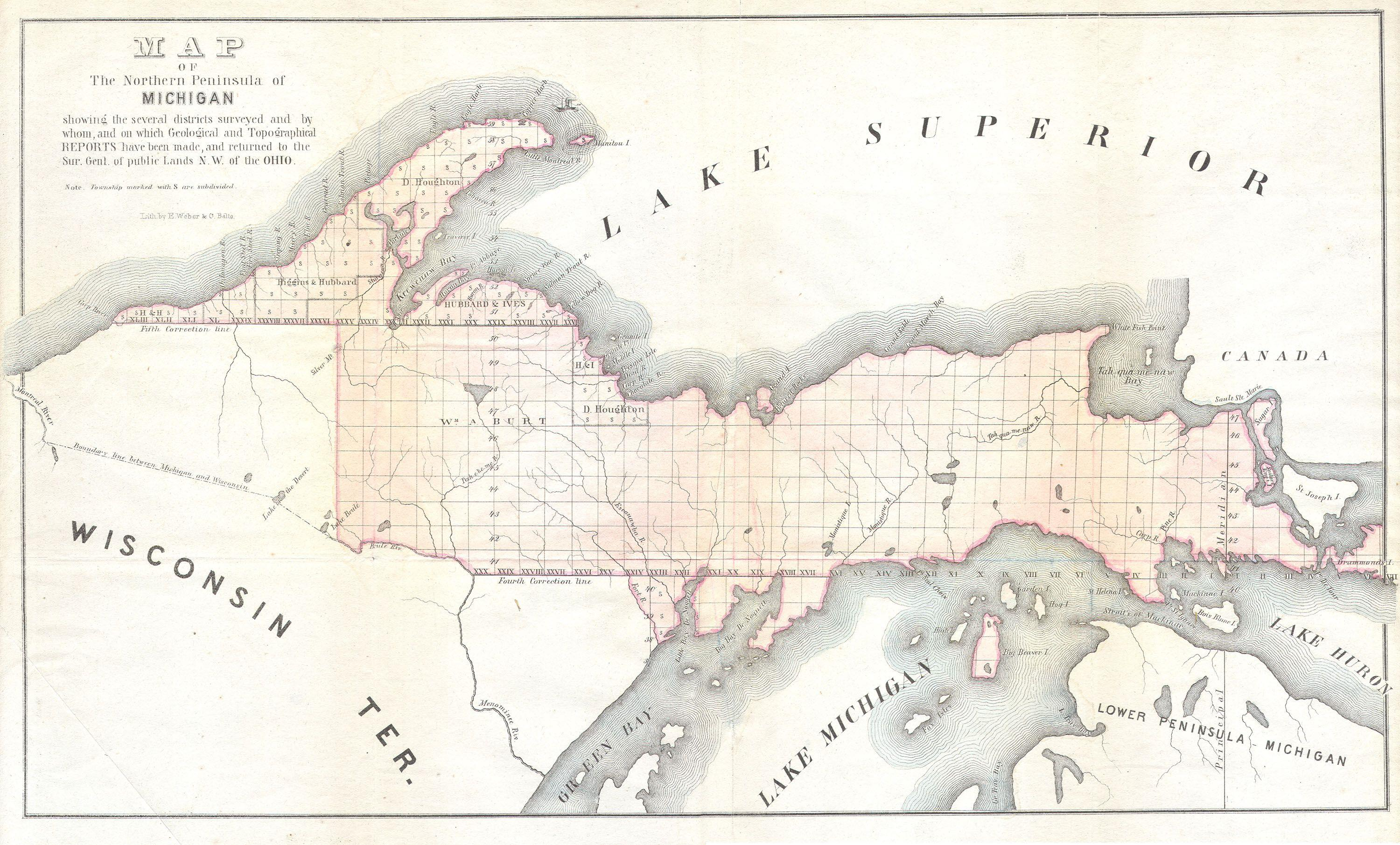
1849 Land Survey Map of Michigan Upper Peninsula

As part of the settlement of the Toledo War, between Michigan and Ohio, most of the Upper Peninsula of Michigan was granted to Michigan. The United States Congress created the Wisconsin Territory in 1836 and appropriated funds to conduct a survey to determine the boundary between Wisconsin and Michigan. In 1840, Cram and Douglass Houghton led the boundary survey team up the Menominee River to its source at Brule Lake. A previous map incorrectly listed Lac Vieux Desert as the headwater of the Menominee River and the Montreal River. He negotiated a treaty with the Ojibwa Chief Ca-sha-o-sha which allowed the survey to continue. The survey could not be completed in 1840 due to errors in the map used by Congress to determine the boundary. Cram returned to the Upper Peninsula in 1841 to continue the survey. He identified Lac Vieux Desert as the source of the Wisconsin River and recommended a different boundary between Wisconsin and Michigan. Congress used the border Cram recommended when it passed the Wisconsin Enabling Act of 1846 prior to Wisconsin becoming a state in 1848. Michigan refuted the results of the survey and claimed that Cram's interpretation of the boundary cheated Michigan out of 800 square miles (2,072 km^{2}) of land. The case reached the United States Supreme Court in 1926 and was decided in favor of Wisconsin.

In 1841, Cram began work with the United States Lake Survey. His portion of its survey began at Green Bay, Wisconsin, and moved south toward Chicago while William G. Williams began his portion at Green Bay and moved north toward Mackinac Island.

In 1843, Cram conducted work in Louisville, Kentucky, to improve navigation of the Falls of the Ohio on the Ohio River. He recommended the expansion of the Louisville and Portland Canal and construction of a second canal to provide two-way river traffic, but Congress did not approve his recommendations and they were not implemented.

In 1844, Cram was assigned to improve the harbor works at St. Louis, Missouri. The harbor required improvements because the flow of the Mississippi River had formed sandbars that trapped ships or required long diversions to avoid them. He proposed several works to remedy the situation but they were deemed too experimental and expensive. The construction of a dam was selected and work began on it until it was interrupted by the outbreak of the Mexican-American War in 1846.

In 1845, Cram served as chief topographical engineer in the Army of Occupation under Major General Zachary Taylor during the Mexican-American War. He conducted systematic topographic surveys of the Nueces River, the Laguna de la Madre, and Aransas Bay. He fell ill with dysentery and was replaced by George Meade.

From 1847 to 1855, he worked as an assistant in the United States Coast Survey and had the responsibility for the New England region.

From 1855 to 1858 he was the chief topographical engineer for the Department of the Pacific. He led survey teams on expeditions through the Oregon and Washington Territories and worked to determine the feasibility of a water route to the Pacific Ocean through Central America.

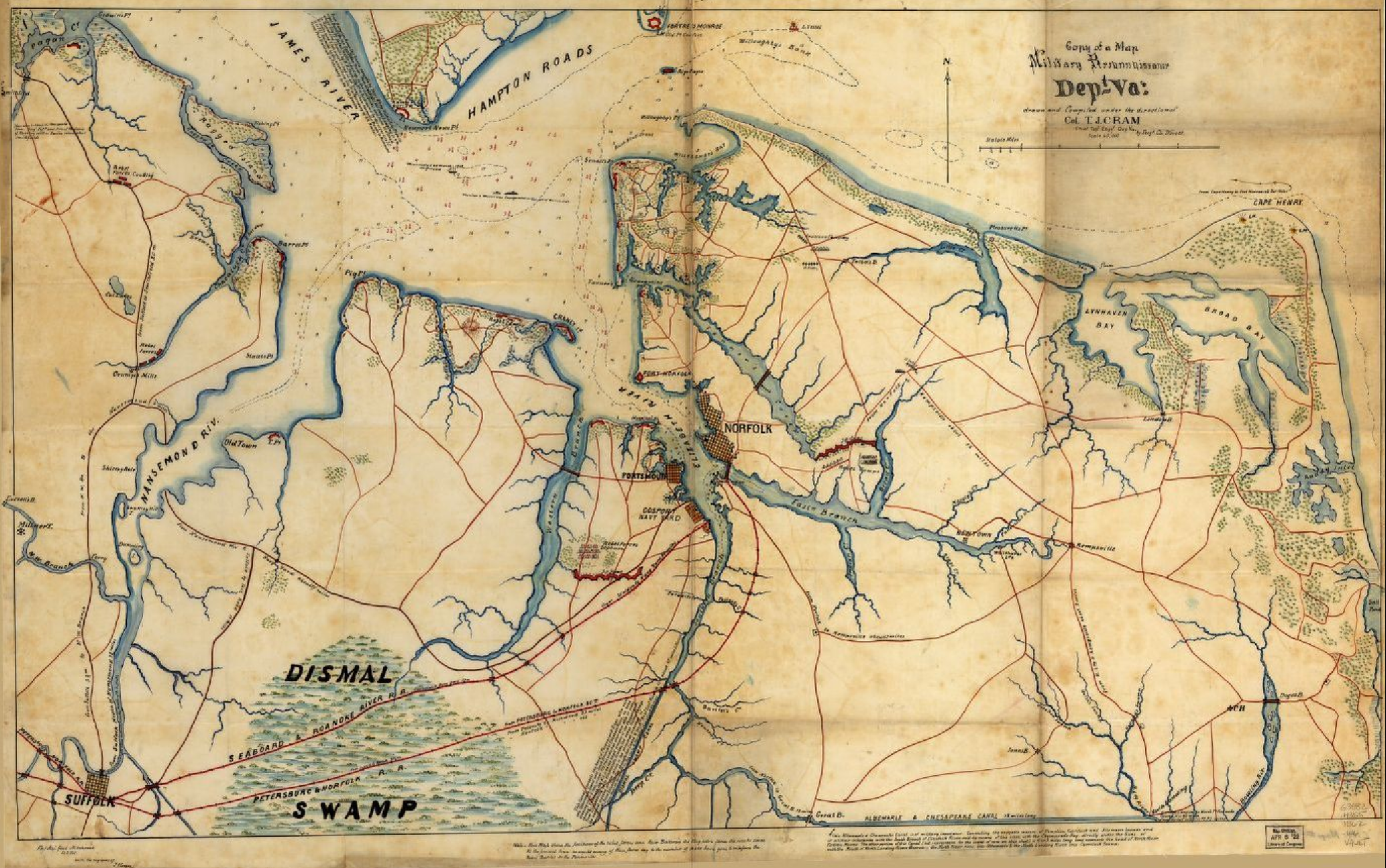
A Union Army military reconnaissance map of Hampton Roads and Norfolk, Virginia, Cram made during the American Civil War

The American Civil War broke out in April 1861. Cram was promoted to major in August 1861 and then to lieutenant colonel in September 1861. He served as aide to Brigadier General — from May 1862 Major General — John E. Wool from 1861 to 1863 and was engaged in the campaign to capture Norfolk, Virginia, in May 1862. Cram transferred to the United States Army Corps of Engineers when the Topographical Engineers were disbanded in 1863, and was promoted to colonel at the end of the war in 1865. He was later brevetted to major general to recognize his war service, and served until his retirement in 1869.

Cram died in Philadelphia, Pennsylvania, and was interred at Laurel Hill Cemetery.

== Bibliography ==
- Basin of the Mississippi, and its Natural Business Site, Briefly Considered., New York: Narine & Co., 1851
- Address of Captain T.J. Cram, U.S. Corps of Topographical Engineers, Delivered at the Board of Trade Rooms, June 28 and Repeated Before the Corn Exchange Association, of Philadelphia, July 11, 1860, Upon Ocean Steam Ships Proposed to Run Between Philadelphia and Europe, and California, In the Lines of a Corporation Titled the "California, Philadelphia, and European Steamship Company.", Philadelphia: Jackson Printer, 1860
- Memoir Upon the Northern Inter-Oceanic Route of Commercial Transit, Between Tide Water of the Puget Sound of the Pacific, and, Tide Water of the St. Lawrence Gulf of the Atlantic Ocean., Detroit: Board of Trade, 1868
