= Cleveland Arcade =

Historic structure in Cleveland, Ohio, US

- U.S. National Register of Historic Places
- U.S. National Historic Landmark
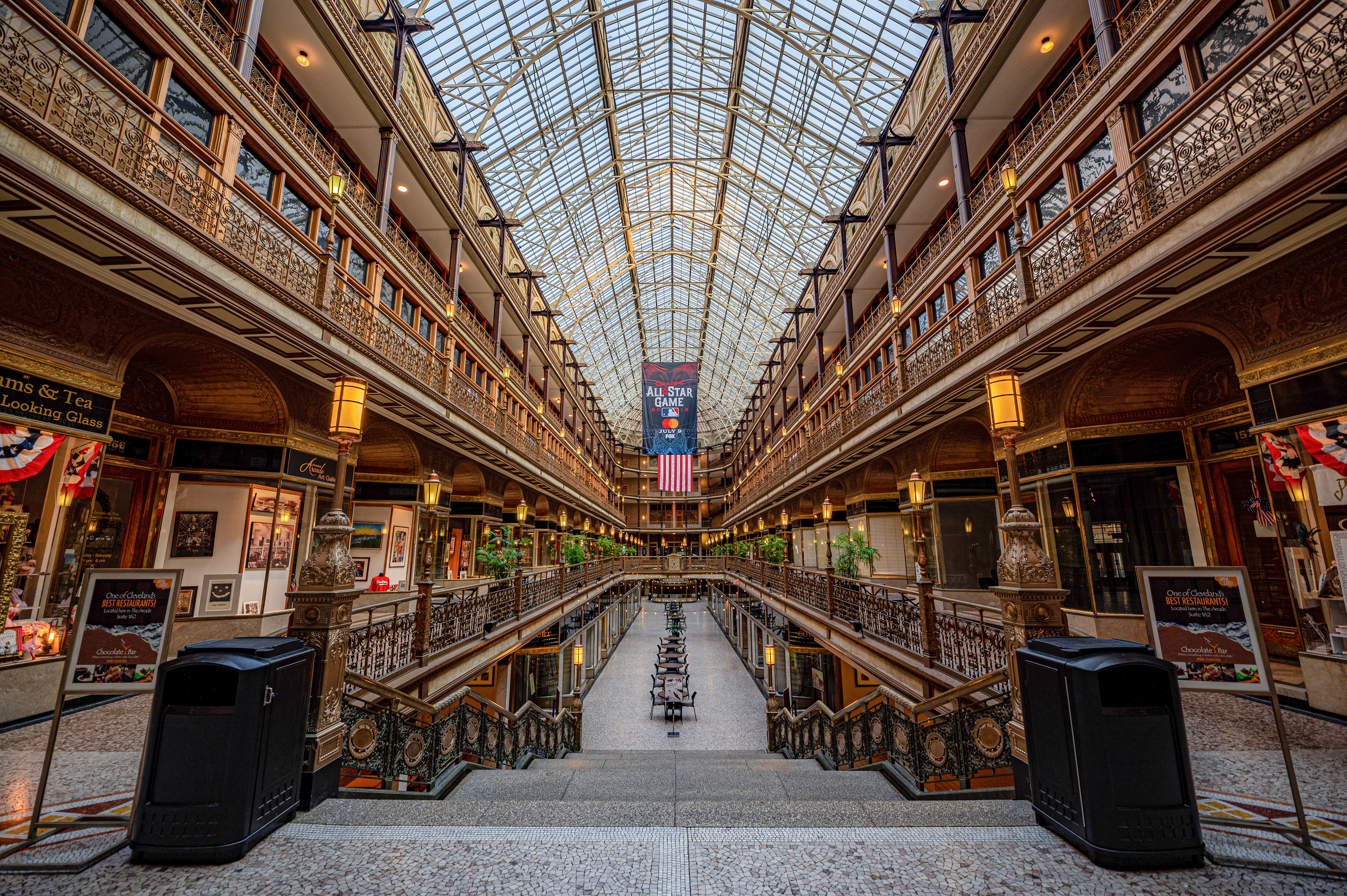
- Looking down the length of The Arcade

- Location within Cleveland Location within Ohio Location within the United States
- Location: Cleveland, Ohio
- Coordinates: 41°30′0″N 81°41′25″W
- Built: 1890
- Architect: Eisenmann & Smith; Detroit Bridge Co.
- Architectural style: Romanesque
- NRHP reference No.: 73001408

Significant dates
- Added to NRHP: March 20, 1973
- Designated NHL: May 15, 1975

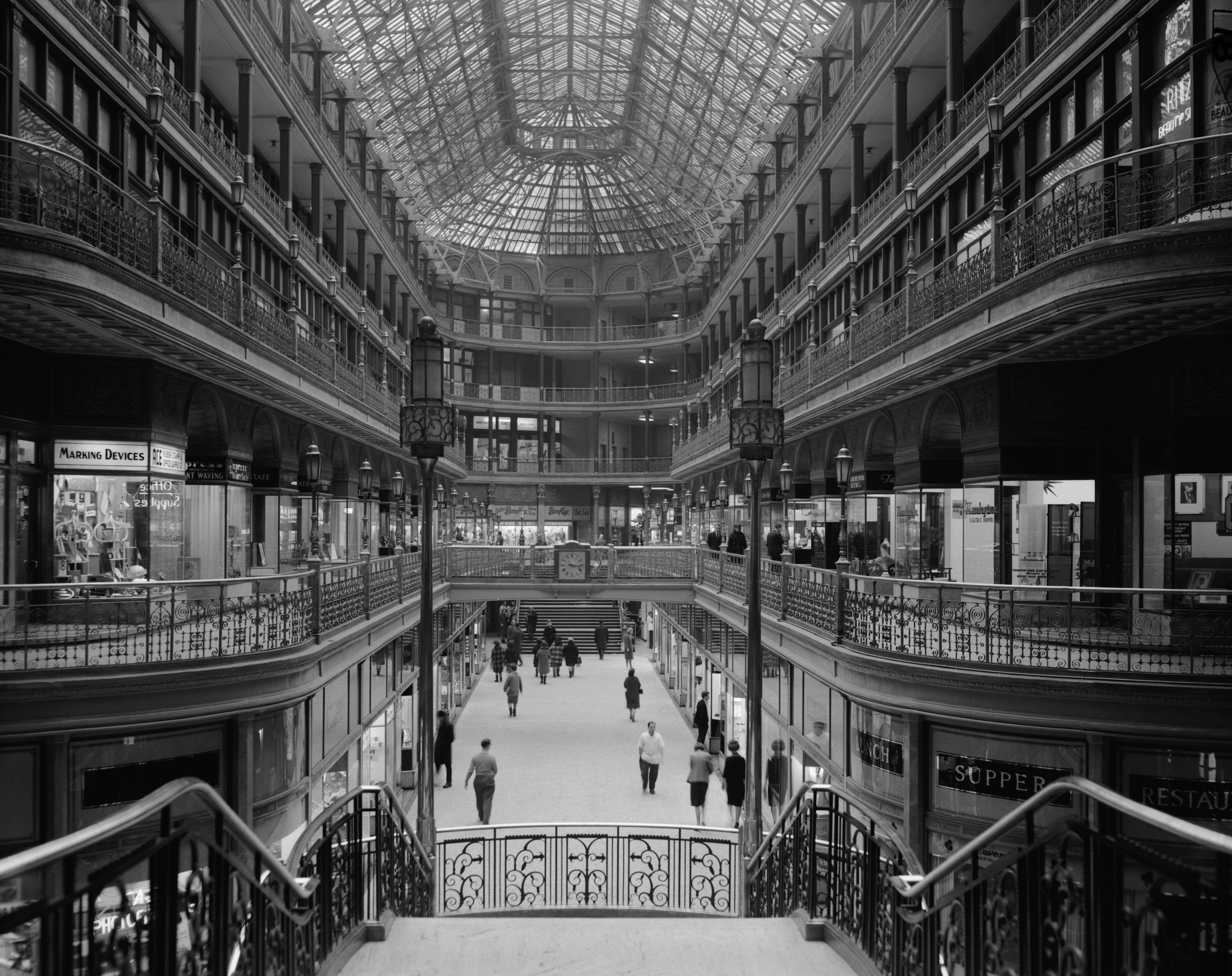
Looking down the length of The Arcade Interior of The Arcade in downtown Cleveland, looking south toward Euclid Avenue; March 7, 1966

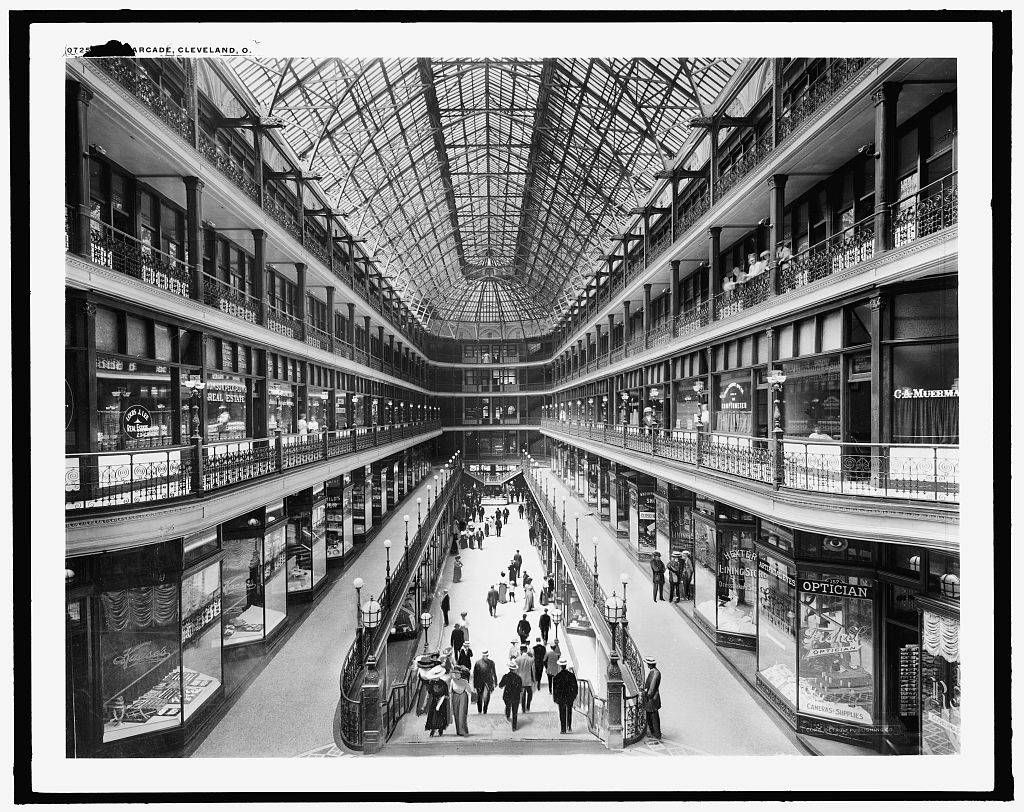
The Arcade (ca. 1910–1920)

The Arcade in downtown Cleveland, Ohio, is a Victorian-era structure of two nine-story buildings, joined by a five-story arcade with a glass skylight spanning over 300 feet (91 m), along the four balconies. Erected in 1890, at a cost of $867,000 ($31,100,000 in 2025 dollars), the Arcade opened on Memorial Day (May 30, 1890), and is identified as one of the earliest indoor shopping arcades in the United States. The Arcade was modified in 1939, remodeling the Euclid Avenue entrance and adding some structural support. It was designated a National Historic Landmark in 1975.

== History ==
The Arcade was built in 1890 by Detroit Bridge Co., run by Stephen V. Harkness. Designed by John Eisenmann and George H. Smith, the Arcade is one of the few remaining arcades of its kind in the United States. Modeled after the Galleria Vittorio Emanuele II located in Milan, the Arcade comprises two nine-story towers with a skylight, 100 feet (30 m) high, made of 1,800 panes of glass spanning over 300 feet (91 m). The construction was financed by John D. Rockefeller, Stephen V. Harkness, Marcus Hanna, Charles F. Brush and several other wealthy Clevelanders of the day. The Arcade is a cross between a lighted court and a commercial shopping street. The building is a complex of three structures: two nine-story office buildings facing out to Euclid and Superior Avenues, connected via the five-story iron-and-glass-enclosed arcade. The Richardsonian arched entrance of Hummelstown brownstone along Superior Avenue is original, but the Euclid Avenue front was remodeled in 1939 by the firm of Walker and Weeks. The level of the Superior Avenue entrance is about 12 feet (3.7 m) lower than the Euclid entrance, so that there are two bottom arcade floors, joined by staircases at each end. Since Euclid and Superior avenues are not parallel, a passage leads, at a 23-degree angle, off the Euclid entrance to a rotunda at the southern end of the Arcade. The arcade itself is a 300-foot (91 m)-long covered light court, ringed by four levels of balconies, which step back above the Euclid Avenue level. The vertical lines of the columns, rising nearly 100 feet (33 m) to the glass roof, create a spacious domed interior.

The Arcade's design inspired a similar shopping arcade in Atlanta called the Peachtree Arcade, which was constructed in the 1910s.

In 2001, the Hyatt corporation redeveloped the Arcade into Cleveland's first Hyatt Regency hotel. The Hyatt Regency occupies the two towers and the top three floors of the atrium area. The two lower floors of the atrium area remain open to the public with retail merchants and a food court. In addition, the Hyatt's lobby and offices are located near the Superior Avenue entrance. That same year, the skylight was also replaced.

== In popular culture ==
in 2024, DC Studios filmed a scene in the Cleveland Arcade for the film Superman, depicting Superman and Lois kissing while flying in the Arcade.

== See also ==
- Galleria Vittorio Emanuele II
- Moscow GUM
- St. Petersburg Passage
- Burlington Arcade
- Paddock Arcade
- Passage des Panoramas
- Queen Victoria Building
- Westminster Arcade
