= Viaducts of Atlanta =

Aspect of transportation in Atlanta, USA

The Viaducts of Atlanta were mainly created in the 1920s to bridge numerous level crossings of roads and railroads.

Atlanta was founded as a railroad city. It had at least six major rail lines entering the city. There were many places where pedestrian traffic encountered that on the rails. The first viaduct was just the Broad Street bridge which was rebuilt several times, the second wooden version designed by Lemuel Grant in 1865, but longer viaducts were coming.

== Downtown viaducts ==
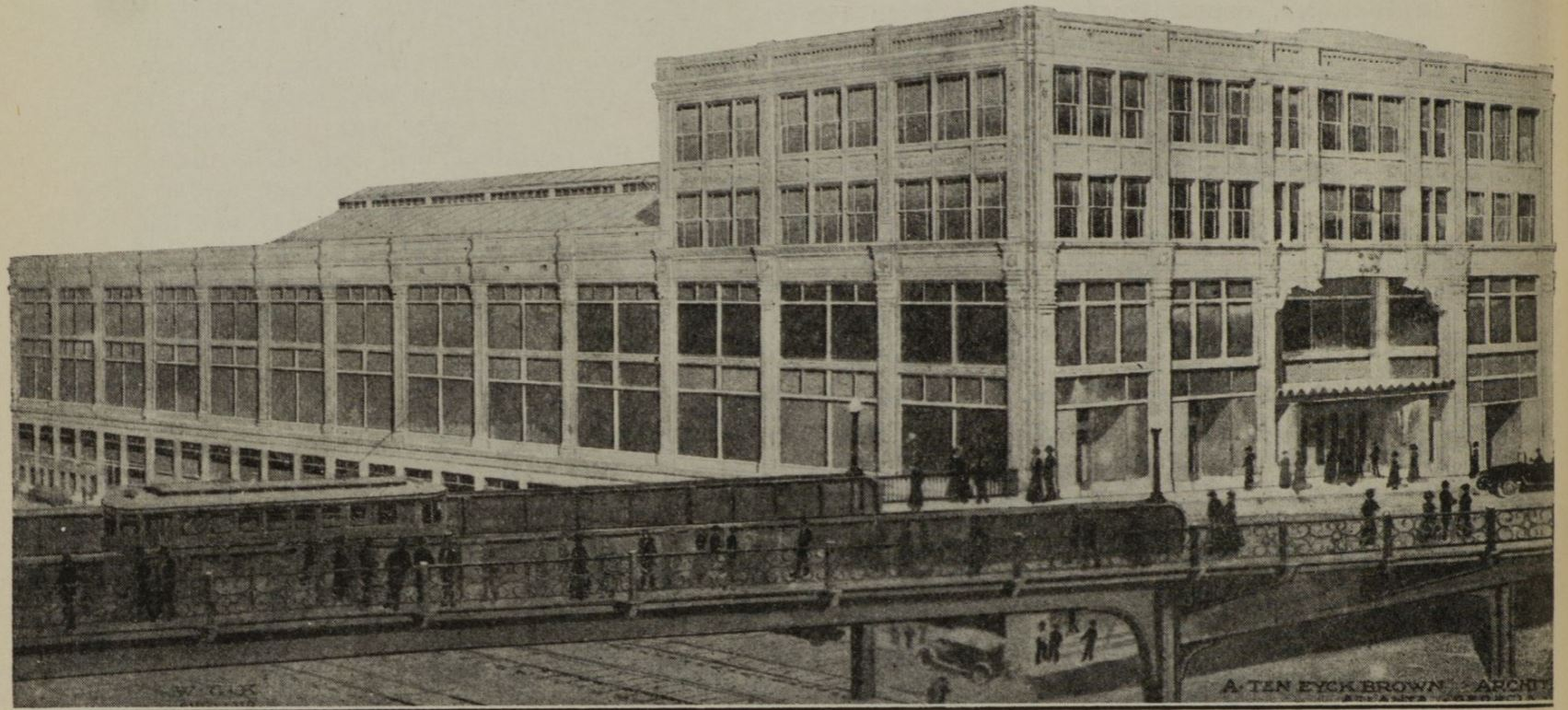
The Peachtree Street viaduct in front of the Peachtree Arcade, 1917

- Mitchell Street (1899), which crosses the Central of Georgia Railway tracks
- Peachtree Street (opened October 9, 1901) at a cost of $76,662.38 rebuilt (opened October 1, 2007) at a cost of $6.7 million
- Courtland Street (1906), which crosses the Georgia Railroad tracks, demolished and rebuilt (opened October 8th, 2018)
- Washington Street (1909), which crosses the Central of Georgia Railroad tracks
- Spring Street (opened December 20, 1923) – 1,900 feet (580 m) Southern half rebuilt (1996), northern half being rebuilt (2014–2015)
- Pryor Street (1929) – 1,291 feet (393 m)
- Central Avenue viaduct (1929) – 1,174 feet (358 m)
- Hunter Street lateral – 914 feet (279 m)
- Alabama Street lateral – 776 feet (237 m)
- Wall Street lateral – 695 feet (212 m)
- Techwood Drive Viaduct

== Other viaducts ==
In January 1913, the Bellwood Viaduct was opened, allowing car and foot traffic to cross the railroad line parallel to Marietta Street to the west side of the city via Bellwood avenue (now Donald Lee Hollowell Parkway).

== Gallery of viaduct plaques ==
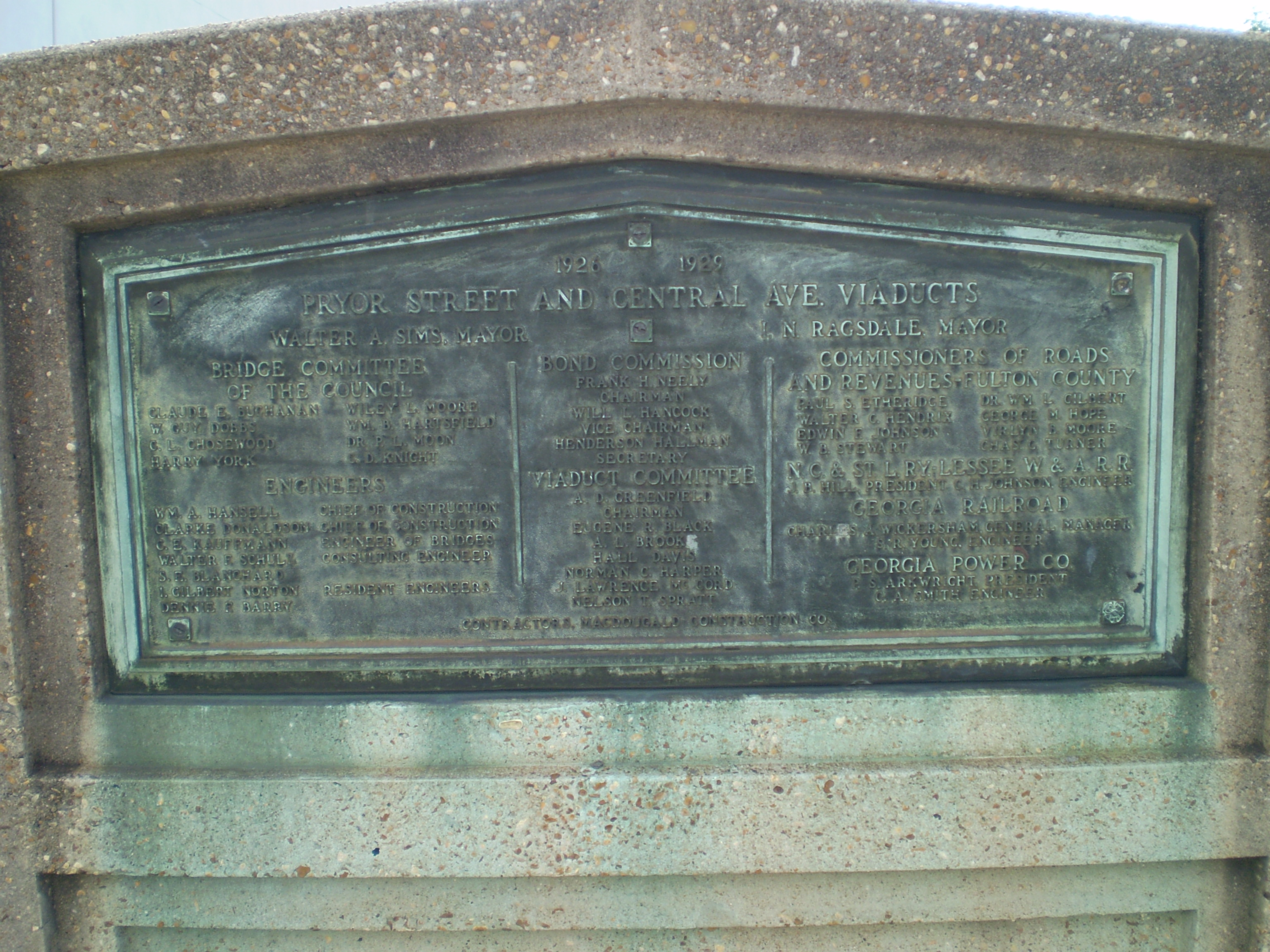
Pryor Street and Central Avenue viaducts

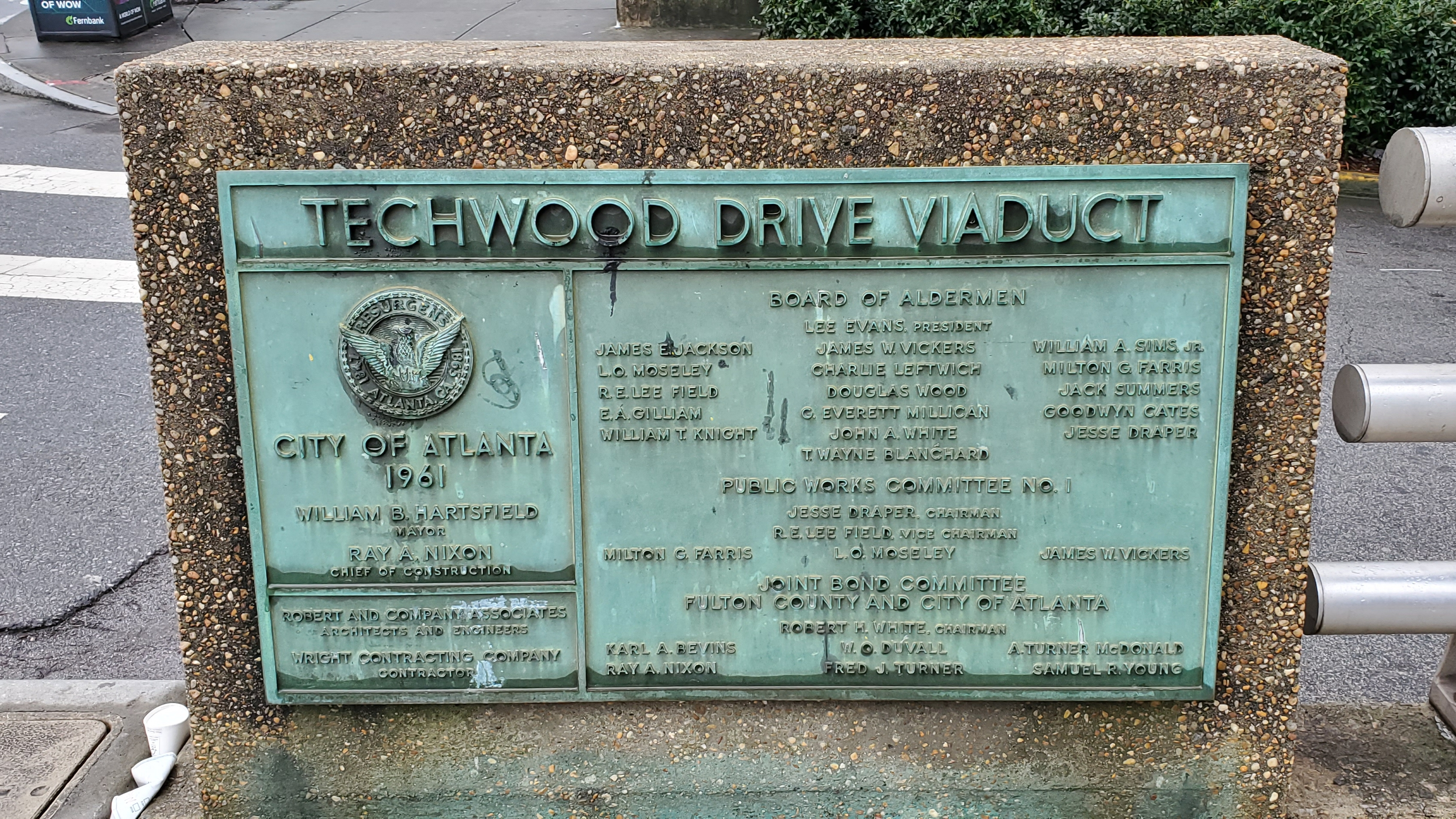
Techwood Drive Viaduct
