= Washington Hood =

American soldier and surveyor (1808–1840)

- Born: February 2, 1808; Philadelphia, Pennsylvania, U.S.
- Died: July 17, 1840 (aged 32); Bedford Springs, Pennsylvania
- Alma mater: United States Military Academy
- Military career
- Allegiance: United States
- Branch: U.S. Army
- Rank: Captain
- Unit: Corps of Topographical Engineers

Washington Hood (February 2, 1808 – July 17, 1840) was an American surveyor with the U.S. Army Corps of Topographical Engineers. A 1827 West Point graduate, he worked with fellow officer Robert E. Lee to determine the boundary line between the state of Ohio and Michigan Territory in 1835.

== Biography ==
Hood was born on February 2, 1808, in Philadelphia. He was the eldest of twelve children born to Eliza Forebaugh and John McClellan Hood, an Irish immigrant and wholesale grocery and wine merchant. John Hood constructed Hood Mansion, a country estate in Limerick, Pennsylvania, in 1834. The site of a family mausoleum where Hood and his parents are interred, the estate has been abandoned since 2008.

A 1827 graduate of the United States Military Academy, Hood worked as a surveyor and topographical engineer. He is best known for working with fellow officer Robert E. Lee to map the border between the state of Ohio and Michigan Territory in 1835, when he earned a promotion to first lieutenant. He resigned in 1836 to work as a private-sector civil engineer in Cuba before rejoining the Army Corps of Topographical Engineers as a captain. He mapped the Oregon Territory in 1838 but reproduced errors found in earlier maps.

In 1839, President Martin Van Buren dispatched an expedition led by Hood to survey parts of Indian Territory bordering the states of Missouri and Arkansas (present-day northeastern Oklahoma). Hood contracted a disease, probably yellow fever, while on the expedition. He died in Bedford Springs, Pennsylvania, on July 17, 1840, at the age of 32.

Hood's journals, letters, drawings, maps, architectural plans, and other papers are held in the collections of the Winterthur Library and the Beinecke Rare Book and Manuscript Library at Yale University.
