= State of Georgia Building =

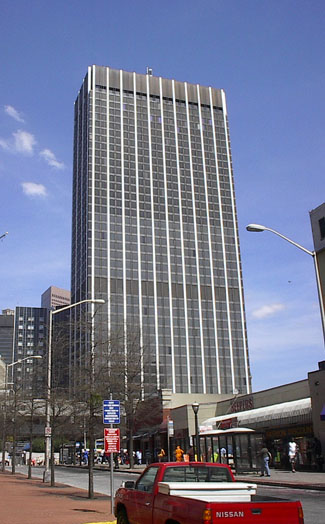
- Interactive map of the State of Georgia Building area
- Former names: First National Bank Building; Wachovia Bank of Georgia Building
- Alternative names: 2 Peachtree Street

General information
- Type: Government offices
- Location: 2 Peachtree Street; Atlanta, Georgia; United States
- Coordinates: 33.754158°N 84.390589°W
- Completed: 1966
- Owner: State of Georgia

Height
- Antenna spire: 182.6 m (599 ft)
- Roof: 169.47 m (556.0 ft)

Technical details
- Floor count: 44

Design and construction
- Architects: Cecil Alexander; FABRAP; Emery Roth & Sons

The State of Georgia Building (also known as 2 Peachtree Street and previously known as the First National Bank Building) is a 44-story, 566 feet (173 m) skyscraper located in downtown Atlanta, Georgia, U.S. Built in 1966, the building was the tallest building in the Southeast at the time. It was Atlanta's tallest until 1976, when the Westin Peachtree Plaza surpassed it. It was built on the site of the Peachtree Arcade, A. Ten Eyck Brown's 1917 covered shopping arcade which connected Peachtree and Broad streets. 2 Peachtree Street was originally constructed as the new headquarters building for First National Bank of Atlanta, also known as First Atlanta, replacing its older (1905) headquarters building next door (the lower half of which remains today as Georgia State's Andrew Young School of Policy Studies). It was designed by a partnership of Atlanta architectural firm FABRAP and New York firm Emery Roth & Sons. First Atlanta was acquired by the holding company for Wachovia Bank in 1985, but continued to operate under its own charter until 1991. In 1991, under new liberalized banking laws, First Atlanta was merged into the charter of Wachovia Bank of Georgia. Shortly thereafter, Wachovia moved its Georgia offices to 191 Peachtree and 2 Peachtree Street was acquired by the state of Georgia for government offices.

== See also ==
- List of tallest buildings in Atlanta
