= Peachtree Arcade =

Shopping arcade in Atlanta, Georgia, US

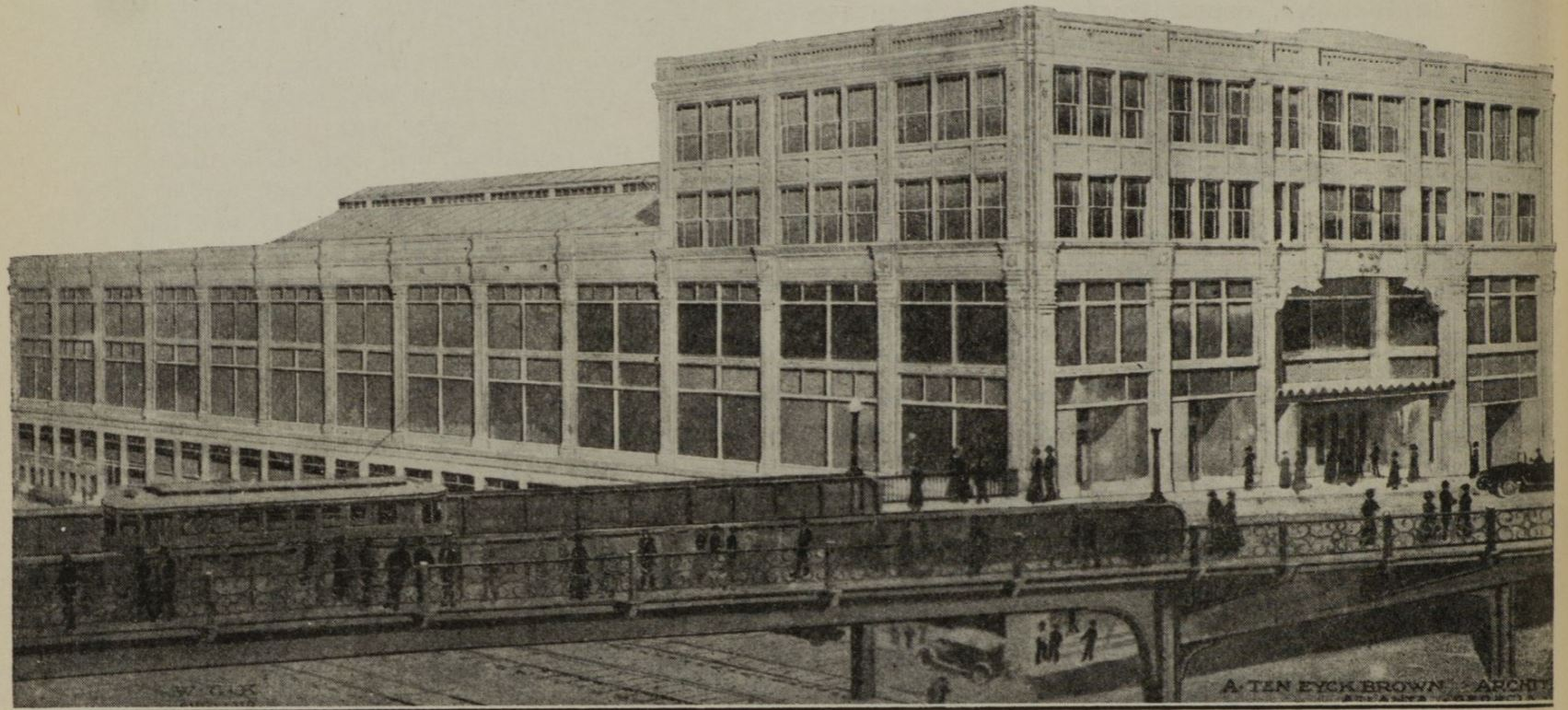
- Peachtree Arcade in 1917, with the Peachtree Street Viaduct in front
- Location: Atlanta, Georgia
- Coordinates: 33°45′15″N 84°23′26″W
- Opened: 1918
- Closed: 1964
- Developer: R. R. Otis
- Owner: Flynn Realty Co.
- Architect: A. Ten Eyck Brown
- Floors: 6

The Peachtree Arcade was a shopping arcade in downtown Atlanta, Georgia, United States. The building, modeled after the Arcade in Cleveland, was designed by Atlanta-based architect A. Ten Eyck Brown and was located between Peachtree Street and Broad Street near Five Points. Construction began in 1917 and was completed the following year. Located in the city's central business district, it was very popular with citizens, functioning as an unofficial "civic center" for the city. However, by the 1960s, the arcade was facing increased competition from shopping malls located in Atlanta's suburbs, and in 1964, the building was demolished to make way for the First National Bank Building, a skyscraper that, at the time of its construction, was the tallest building in both Atlanta and the southeastern United States. In 1993, the American Institute of Architects named the building as one of Atlanta's most notable landmarks to have been destroyed.

== History ==
=== Site prior to the arcade ===
The arcade was located on a plot of land between Peachtree Street and Broad Street near Five Points, running parallel to the Western and Atlantic Railroad. The site had originally been the location of several natural springs that served as the headwaters for Intrenchment Creek, which, through several tributaries, eventually flowed to the Atlantic Ocean via the Altamaha River, with the springs constituting the river's most northwesterly source. In 1845, the land came under the ownership of Patrick Connally and his daughter Mary A. Dougherty, and the land would remain in the family under her descendants until at least 1969. (Note: Atlanta historian Franklin Garrett states in a 1969 book that the property was still owned by the descendants of Dougherty. However, a 1996 article in the Atlanta History journal states that the land had been purchased by R. R. Otis, the developer of the arcade.) During the mid-1850s, the land was home to a ten-pin bowling alley and the first bakery in the city, which were both operated by the Doughertys. That same decade, the three-story Concert Hall Building, which served as barracks and a prison during the American Civil War, was constructed. James J. Andrews, a spy known for his participation in the Great Locomotive Chase, was kept imprisoned at the building prior to his hanging. This building was demolished after the war and was replaced by the National Hotel, which was the largest hotel in the city until the Kimball House was constructed. In addition to operating as a hotel, it also served as a hospital. This building was destroyed by a fire in 1902 (Note: The year 1902 is given in several sources, including a 1969 book by Atlanta historian Franklin Garrett. However, a 1987 book by historian Harold H. Martin gives the year as 1906.) and was later replaced by the Emery Steiner Building. This property was owned by Flynn Realty Co., which was owned by Dougherty's heirs.

Starting in the late 1890s, the city went through a period of rapid growth focused primarily on the area near Five Points, and local business leaders, boosters, and city officials attempted to improve the area's image as a more consumer-friendly part of the city. In 1901, a viaduct was constructed for Peachtree Street over the railroad tracks, improving pedestrian mobility in the area, and between 1909 and 1914, the Atlanta City Council began a project to add electric street lights to the area in order to make it more inviting to consumers. By the 1910s, Peachtree Street had become the main business thoroughfare in the city, with a 1917 article published by the Atlanta Chamber of Commerce calling the site the "most central location" in Atlanta's central business district.

=== Construction ===
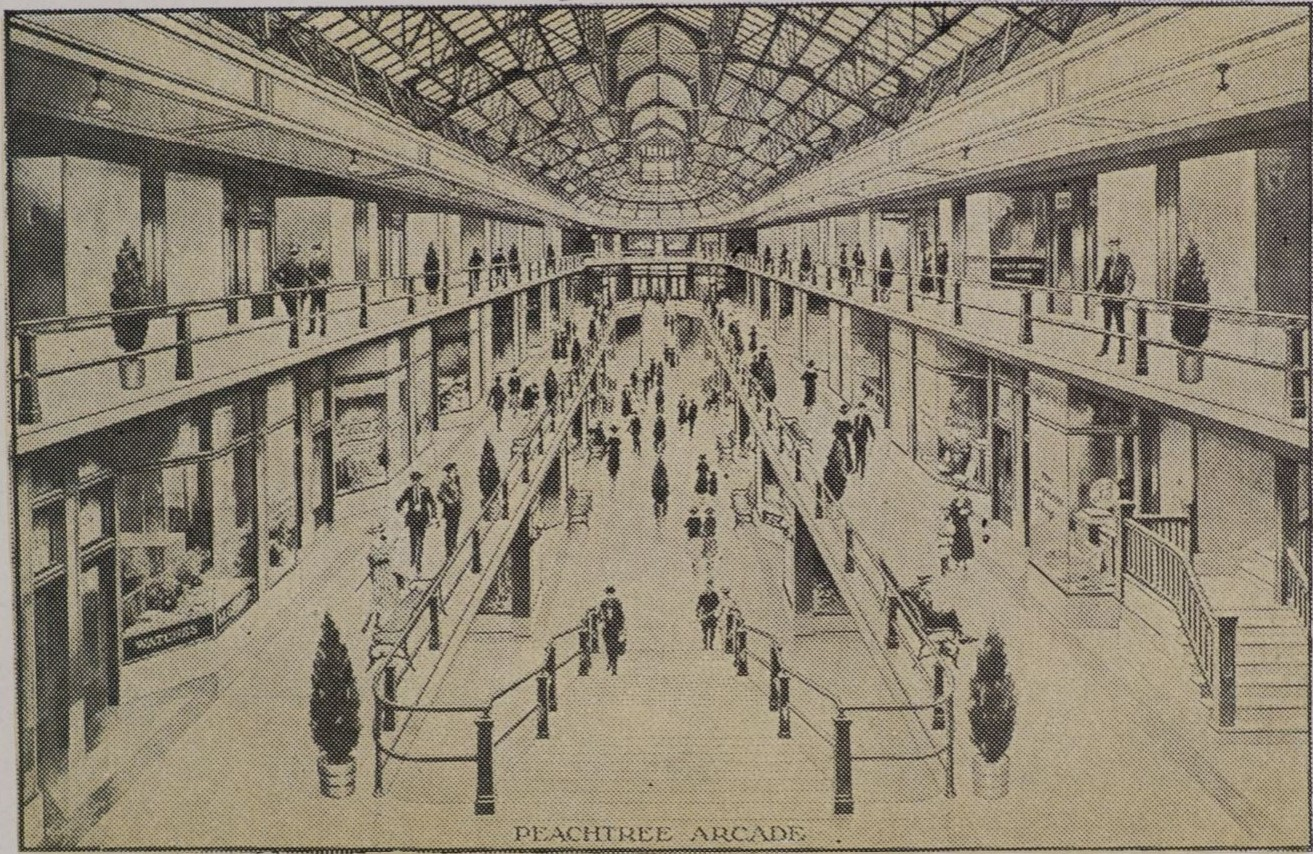
The main atrium area, 1918

The idea for a shopping arcade in Atlanta was proposed by local businessman R. R. Otis, a partner in the real estate firm of Otis & Holliday. During a visit to Cleveland around the turn of the century, he became enamored by the city's Arcade, and he believed that a similar building could be successful in Atlanta. Both the Cleveland and the proposed Atlanta arcade were part of a trend in urban design that saw arcades constructed in numerous cities in Europe and North America, such as the Jardin du Palais-Royal in Paris and the Westminster Arcade in Providence, Rhode Island. In 1916, Atlanta-based architect A. Ten Eyck Brown drew up designs for the new structure, modeling the overall design heavily after the Cleveland Arcade. Brown's work on the arcade would later help him in acquiring more large architectural projects in the city, including the City Hall (1930) and the Post Office (1933). Otis selected the site of the Emery Steiner Building to be the location for this new arcade, in large part because it was one of the few pieces of land large enough to accommodate the new structure that was under one ownership. Otis would oversee the construction of the building and would also be in charge of its management after completion, though it would remain under the ownership of Flynn Realty. The completed building would be the first and only shopping arcade in the city. According to an article published in The Atlanta Constitution after the arcade's announcement, the building "will undoubtedly compare favorably with any other such structure in the larger cities of this country and in Europe".

Construction on the building began in March 1917, with A. V. Gude & Co. serving as the general contractors. The project, which cost approximately $500,000, was financed by the Northwestern Life Insurance Company. As part of construction, a part of the structure of the Steiner Building was incorporated into the new building. Initially, work went smoothly, aided by good weather, and a September 10 article published by the chamber of commerce on the building stated that it was expected to be completed on time. However, despite the plans for a completion in 1917, a labor shortage caused by emergency government work in the area slowed down progress, and it wasn't completely finished until 1918. By February 1918, with work still going on finishing touches that were expected to take several weeks, businesses had already begun moving into the building, with an occupancy of over 75 percent.

=== Arcade in operation ===
The arcade was very popular with the public at large, with the chamber of commerce describing it as a "civic center" and "the show place of Atlanta". In its first few years it attracted several nationwide retail chains, such as a Carson Pirie Scott & Co. department store, and the arcade also served as the home for what would eventually be known as Georgia State University. In its role as a civic center, the arcade hosted numerous events, such as annual Christmas tree displays and Veterans Day dance and music programs performed by schoolchildren. During World War I, prayer services were held in the arcade, and in 1950, during one of his crusades, evangelist Billy Graham held another large service. The arcade primarily catered to women consumers, and many of the shops were also run by women. The arcade featured several stereotypically feminine businesses, such as a floral, jewelry, millinery, and perfume shops, and also included a day care that allowed mothers to shop without watching their children. Additionally, during World War I, the YWCA relocated their Atlanta headquarters to inside the arcade, and by the 1920s the arcade also hosted two schools that prepared women for work in clerical professions. The arcade was such a fixture among women in Atlanta that in a 1996 article about the arcade, historian Georgina Hickey said it "was the physical embodiment of early-Twentieth-Century Atlanta's consumer culture and its ties to Atlanta's women".

=== Demolition ===
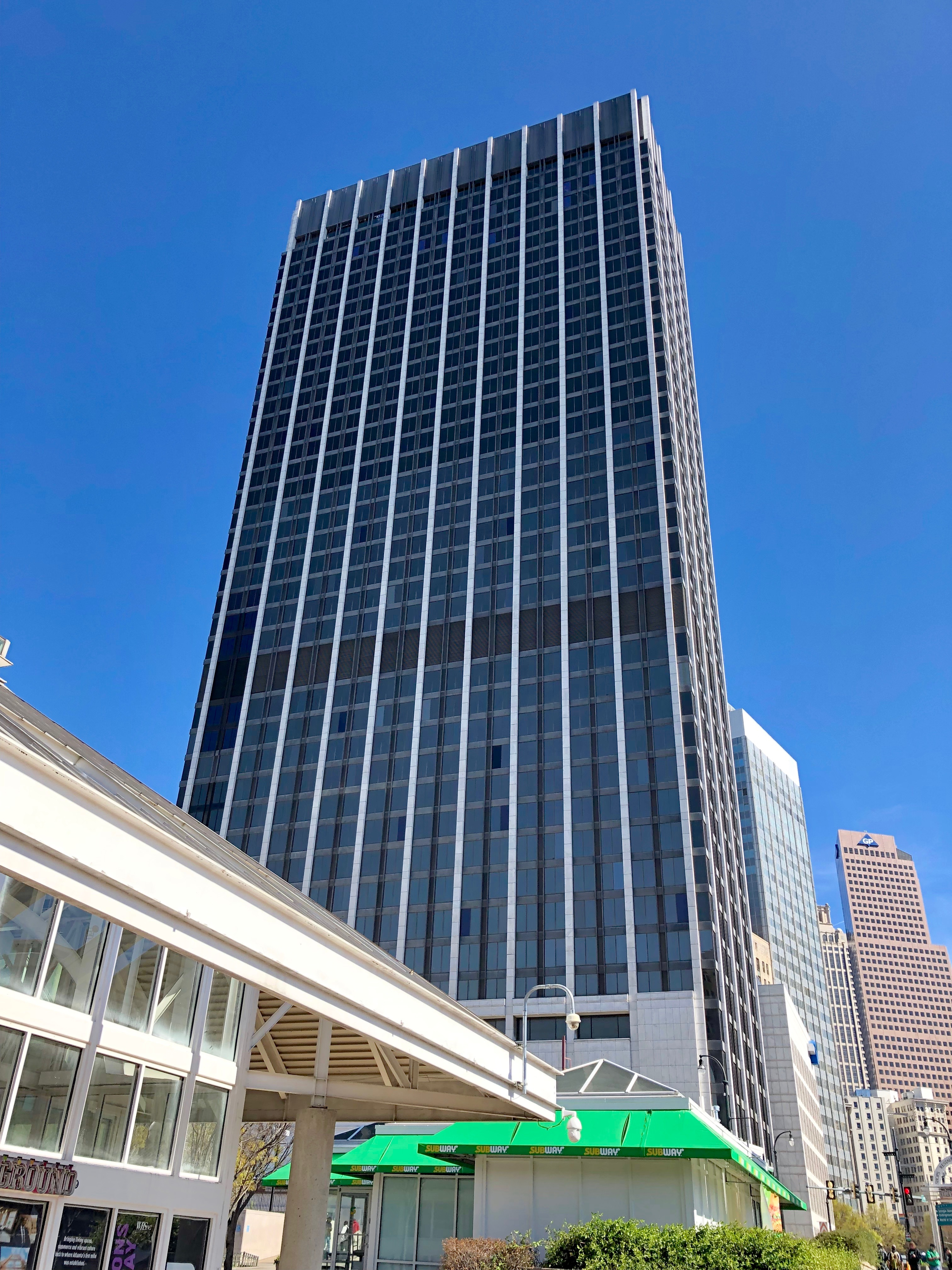
The First National Bank Building was built on the site of the arcade.

Despite its popularity, by the 1960s, the arcade faced increasing competition from shopping malls in Atlanta's suburbs. The decade saw a construction boom in Atlanta, though many of these new buildings were constructed north of Five Points, further hurting the arcade. Around this time, the First National Bank of Atlanta, which had its headquarters next to the arcade at Five Points, announced that they would be purchasing the arcade and demolishing it in order to build a skyscraper addition to their headquarters. The arcade was demolished in 1964. The First National Bank Building that replaced it was completed in 1966 and was the tallest building in both Atlanta and the entire southeastern United States at the time. In a 1993 book on the architecture of Atlanta, the American Institute of Architects listed the Peachtree Arcade as one of the most notable landmarks in the city to have been demolished, alongside the Carnegie Library, the Equitable Building, and Terminal Station.

== Architecture ==
The arcade had a frontage of 111 feet (34 m) on its Peachtree Street entrance and a frontage of 146 feet (45 m) on its Broad Street entrance. Both entrances featured glazed terracotta designs. On the Peachtree entrance, which included a three-story arc, the building was 6 stories tall, while it was only 4 stories tall on the Broad Street side. The building was also built to allow the addition of eight more floors, if desired. The arcade connected the two streets, functioning similarly to a covered pedestrian road, and both entrances were located at viaduct level. It ran parallel to the railroad's right-of-way, and the building was designed to be compatible with the Bleckley Plaza Plan. The building as a whole was designed in the Beaux-Arts style.

The open central area was about 40 feet (12 m) wide and ran the length of the building from entrance to entrance, which was 316 feet (96 m). This central atrium area included three levels of shops, with the main floor holding 40 stores. The interior featured wrought iron railings, marble floors, and bronze finishings throughout.

== Sources ==
- Bidwell, Spencer Jr. (December 1970). "Atlanta's Early Builders". The Atlanta Historical Bulletin. XV (4). Atlanta Historical Society: 88–96.
- "Peachtree Arcade". The City Builder. II (2). Atlanta Chamber of Commerce: 25. February 10, 1918a.
- "Peachtree Arcade". The City Builder. III (5). Atlanta Chamber of Commerce: 22. July 1918b.
- Craig, Robert M. (2012). The Architecture of Francis Palmer Smith, Atlanta's Scholar-Architect. Athens, Georgia: University of Georgia Press. ISBN 978-0-8203-2898-0.
- Garrett, Franklin M. (1969a). Atlanta and Environs: A Chronicle of Its People and Events, 1820s-1870s. Vol. I. Athens, Georgia: University of Georgia Press. ISBN 978-0-8203-0263-8.
- Garrett, Franklin M. (1969b). Atlanta and Environs: A Chronicle of Its People and Events, 1880s-1930s. Vol. II. Athens, Georgia: University of Georgia Press. ISBN 978-0-8203-3904-7.
- Gournay, Isabelle (1993). Sams, Gerald W. (ed.). AIA Guide to the Architecture of Atlanta. Foreword by Dana F. White. Athens, Georgia: University of Georgia Press. ISBN 978-0-8203-1439-6.
- Hickey, Georgina (Fall 1996 – Winter 1997). ""Meet Me at the Arcade": Women, Business, and Consumerism in Downtown Atlanta, 1917–1964". Atlanta History: A Journal of Georgia and the South. XL (3–4). Atlanta History Center: 5–15.
- James, Robert P. (September 10, 1917). "Peachtree Arcade Nearing Completion: Prominent Realty Man Realizes Ambition of His Life". The City Builder. II (7). Atlanta Chamber of Commerce: 23–24.
- Judson, Sarah Mercer (2006). "Solving the Girl Problem: Race, Womanhood, and Leisure in Atlanta during World War I". In Boswell, Angela; McArthur, Judith N. (eds.). Women Shaping the South: Creating and Confronting Change. Columbia, Missouri: University of Missouri Press. pp. 152–173. ISBN 978-0-8262-6486-2.
- Martin, Harold H. (1987). Atlanta and Environs: A Chronicle of Its People and Events: Years of Change and Challenge, 1940-1976. Vol. III. Athens, Georgia: University of Georgia Press. ISBN 978-0-8203-0913-2.
- Mitchell, Eugene M. (May 1930a). "Atlanta's First Real Estate Subdivision". The Atlanta Historical Bulletin. I (3). Atlanta Historical Society: 7–14.
- Mitchell, Stephens (May 1930b). "Atlanta: The Industrial Heart of the Confederacy". The Atlanta Historical Bulletin. I (3). Atlanta Historical Society: 20–27.
- "Peachtree Arcade". New Georgia Encyclopedia. Archived from the original on August 5, 2022.
- Williford, William Bailey (2010). Peachtree Street, Atlanta (Paperback ed.). Athens, Georgia: University of Georgia Press. ISBN 978-0-8203-3477-6.
