= Sitgreaves Expedition =

1851 exploration of the Colorado and Little Colorado Rivers

- Part of the American Indian Wars
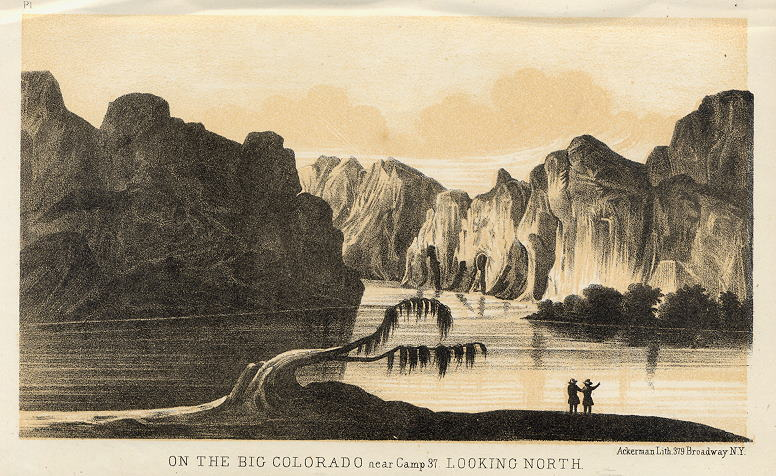
- On the Big Colorado, near Camp 37 by J. Ackerman.
Date	September 1851 – November 30, 1851
Location	New Mexico Territory, Arizona Territory, California
Result	United States victory in battle, successful expedition.

Belligerents
United States	Mohave

Commanders and leaders
Lorenzo Sitgreaves	unknown

Strength
51 infantry	~55 warriors

Casualties and losses
1 killed	4 killed

The Sitgreaves Expedition Down the Zuni and Colorado Rivers in 1851 was a combined American scientific and military mission to explore the Zuni River, the Little Colorado River and the Colorado River in 1851. Setting out from northern New Mexico, the expedition traveled west across Arizona and then south along the Colorado to Fort Yuma in California. Mohave native Americans attacked the explorers during their trek across the desert and in a short battle the natives were repulsed.

== Expedition ==
Since the Mexican Cession of 1848, topographers, naturalists and other enthusiasts had wanted to explore two of the largest rivers in the newly acquired lands so in 1850, an expedition was organized for that purpose. United States Army commanders were also interested in the area as tension with the Mormons was high and war was expected. Specifically the expedition was sent to map the riverways and determine if they could be navigated by river steamers. Before the establishment of railroads across the Old West, the frontier's riverways were seen, and used, as a valued means of transportation. Captain Lorenzo Sitgreaves, of the Corps of Topographical Engineers, was appointed commander and with fifty infantrymen, some porters and the small group of enthusiasts, they headed west from the Zuni Pueblo in September 1851 for the Zuni River. Passing through the Petrified Forest, the party reached the Zuni and followed it southwest to its mouth at the confluence with the Little Colorado just north of present-day Woodruff, Arizona.

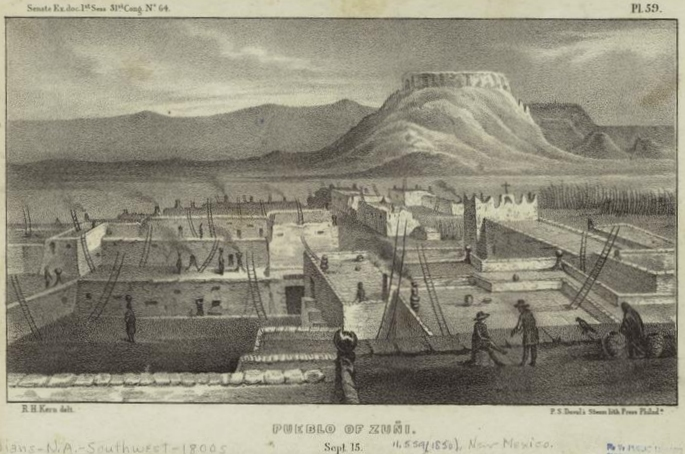
The Zuni Pueblo in 1850.

At the Little Colorado the Americans proceeded northwest until having to detour around a canyon in which the river flowed through. It was during this detour that the Americans discovered the Wupatki Ruins before making a prolonged turn around the south side of the Bill Williams Mountain. When they reached what was later named Union Pass, near Bullhead City, the party found the Colorado. The expedition up to this point was pleasant, the topographers made their maps, the artists drew several pictures of fauna and landscapes and the military men focused on keeping the enthusiasts from staying at one place for too long. After making it only a short distance south down the Colorado, Captain Sitgreaves' men reported signs of natives in the area and soon after they were met by the Mohave at their camp. Initially peaceful, the Mohaves invited the Americans to a pow wow where the two groups exchanged gifts and engaged in conversation.

Sitgreaves reported that the natives brought many different types of fruits and vegetables which suggested that they were interested in developing trade relations. But the friendliness of the Mohave soon wore off when on one October night, the Americans were growing restless after a long visit from the natives at their camp that they asked them to leave. This upset some of the Mohave women who protested and the next morning several arrows were fired into the camp. One wounded the expedition's doctor in the leg but with his medical experience he was capable of preventing serious harm. Sitgreaves decided it was best to break camp and the Mohave let him without further confrontation. On or about October 22, the Americans reached a friendly Mohave village and learned from a Spanish speaking native that Fort Yuma and the mouth of the Gila River, which connects with the Colorado, was only eight days distant. Again the Americans gave the Mohave elders gifts but they remained on alert, fearing an incident similar to the last.

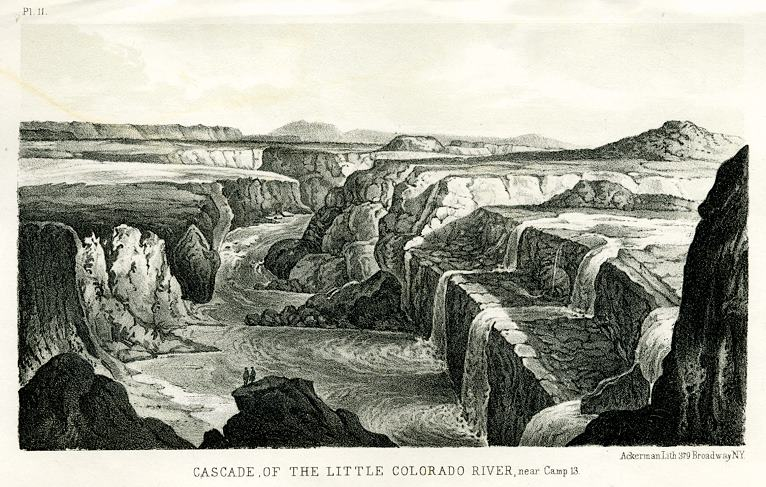
A lithograph of the Little Colorado made during the expedition.

The next day as the Americans moved on, one soldier was lagging behind and attacked by about fifty-five warriors armed with bows and covered in stripes. He was killed and the warriors moved forward to attack Sitgreaves' column. When the captain realized he was under attack, skirmishers were deployed and in a short engagement, four Mohaves were killed and some others wounded. The only American casualty was the first soldier who was relieved of his musketoon when the Mohave retreated. From there the expedition continued on for another week or so until reaching the war zone of Fort Yuma on November 30, 1851, after nearly starving to death and after losing most of their equipment. At the fort Sitgreaves discovered that the outpost was badly in need of provisions also and as a result, the party had to cook and eat all of their mules before making it to San Diego.

== Aftermath ==
Despite a treacherous journey, the mission was technically a success, the Zuni, the Little Colorado and the Big Colorado were mapped and this intelligence provided westward bound settlers with a possible avenue for emigration. The rivers were found to be fully navigable and from then on a growing number of river steamers and schooners began sailing the Colorado. Captain Sitgreaves made a thorough account of the expedition in his 1854 book Report of an Expedition Down the Zuni and Colorado Rivers.

== See also ==
- Sitgreaves National Forest
- Mohave War
- Edward Fitzgerald Beale
