= United States Army Corps of Topographical Engineers =

Civil engineering branch of the U.S. Army (1838-63)

U.S. Army Corps of Topographical Engineers
- Active: 1838–1863
- Country: United States of America
- Allegiance: United States Army
- Branch: Regular Army

Commanders
- Notable commanders: John James Abert (1838–61); Stephen Harriman Long (1861–63)

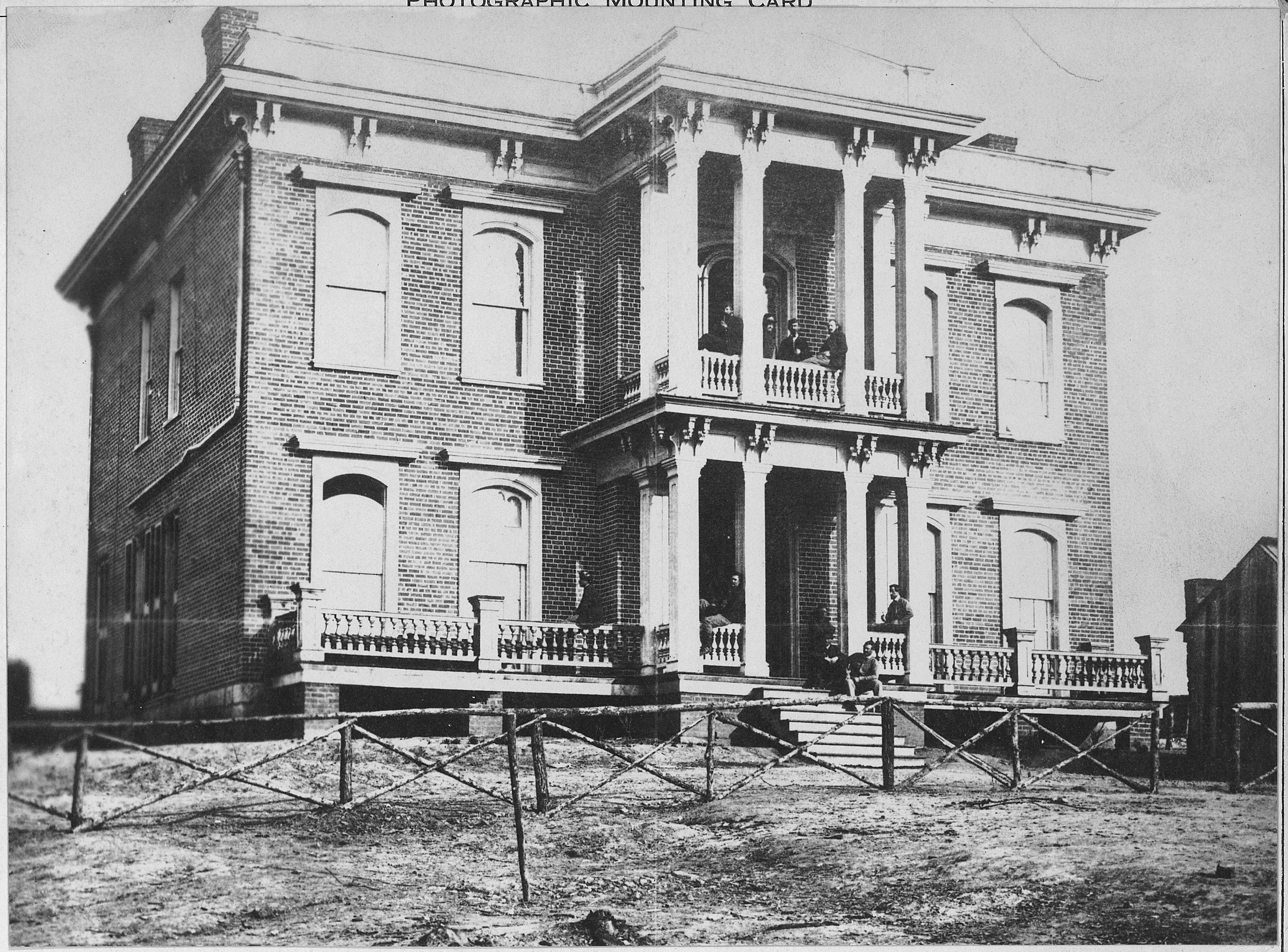
The headquarters for the Corps of Topographical Engineers, ca. 1860-1865

The U.S. Army Corps of Topographical Engineers was a branch of the United States Army authorized on 4 July 1838. It consisted only of officers who were handpicked from West Point and was used for mapping and the design and construction of federal civil works such as lighthouses and other coastal fortifications and navigational routes. Members included such officers as George Meade, John C. Frémont, George H. Derby, Thomas J. Cram, Stephen Long, and Washington Hood. It was merged with the United States Army Corps of Engineers on 3 March 1863, at which point the Corps of Engineers also assumed the Lakes Survey for the Great Lakes. In the mid-19th century, Corps of Engineers' officers ran Lighthouse Districts in tandem with U.S. Naval officers.

In 1841, Congress created the Lake Survey. The Survey, based in Detroit, Mich., was charged with conducting a hydrographical survey of the Northern and Northwestern Lakes and preparing and publishing nautical charts and other navigation aids. The Lake Survey published its first charts in 1852.

== Significance ==
William Goetzmann has written:

From the year 1838 down to the Civil War, there existed a small but highly significant branch of the Army called the Corps of Topographical Engineers. ... The Engineers were concerned with recording all of the western phenomena as accurately as possible, whether main-traveled roads or uncharted wilderness. As Army officers they represented the direct concern of the national government the settling of the West. The Corps of Topographical Engineers was a central institution of Manifest Destiny, and in the years before the Civil War its officers made explorations which resulted in the first scientific mapping of the West. They laid out national boundaries and directly promoted the advance of settlement by locating and constructing wagon roads, improving rivers and harbors, even performing experiments for the location of subsurface water in the arid regions. In short, they functioned as a department of public works for the West - and indeed for the whole nation, since the operations of the Corps extended to every state and territory of the United States. The work of the Corps in the West had still broader significance. Since a major part of its work was to assemble scientific information in the form of maps, pictures, statistics, and narrative reports about the West, it contributed importantly to the compilation of scientific knowledge about the interior of the North American continent. The Topographical Engineers were sophisticated men of their time who worked closely with the foremost scholars in American and European centers of learning. Scientists and artists of all nationalities accompanied their expeditions as partners and co-workers. The Army Topographer considered himself by schooling and profession as one of a company of savants. By virtue of his West Point training and status he was an engineer, something above the ordinary field officer, whose duties were confined usually to strictly military tasks. As a Topographical Engineer he on occasion might address the American Association for the Advancement of Science. He probably subscribed to Silliman's American Journal of Science and he was a pillar of the Smithsonian Institution.

== Major expeditions prior to the Corps' creation ==
In all, there were six major expeditions into the Louisiana Purchase, the first being the best known Corps of Discovery led by Lewis and Clark in 1804–1806. A second expedition in 1804 included astronomer and naturalist John Dunbar and prominent Philadelphia chemist William Hunter. This expedition attempted to follow the Red River to its source in Texas, then controlled by Spain, but turned back after three months.

In April 1806 a second Red River Expedition was led by Captain Richard Sparks and included astronomer and surveyor Thomas Freeman and Peter Custis, a University of Pennsylvania medical student who served as the expedition's botanist. The group of 24 traveled 615 miles up the Red River before being turned back by Spanish authorities. President Thomas Jefferson hoped that this expedition would be nearly as important as the one led by Lewis and Clark, but the interruption by Spanish authorities prevented this hope from being realized.

In 1805–1806, Lieutenant Zebulon Pike was ordered by General James Wilkinson, Governor of the Upper Louisiana Territory, to find the source of the Mississippi River.

In 1806–1807, President Jefferson ordered Lieutenant Pike, on another expedition, to find the headwaters of the Arkansas River and Red River. This is better known as the Pike Expedition. Spanish forces arrested Pike and confiscated his papers, but assigned a translator and cartographer to translate Pike's documents.

In 1817 Major Stephen H. Long explored the upper Mississippi River, selecting sites for Fort Smith on the Arkansas River and Fort St. Anthony at the confluence of the Minnesota and Mississippi.

In 1819, President James Monroe and Secretary of War John C. Calhoun ordered General Henry Atkinson to lead what became known as the Yellowstone Expedition. One objective was to eliminate British influence among the Native American tribes in the region. Nearly 1,000 soldiers were transported by five steamboats up the Missouri River to the Mandan villages at the mouth of the Yellowstone, where they built a fort. This was the first known use of steam propulsion in the west.

== Major expeditions by the Corps ==
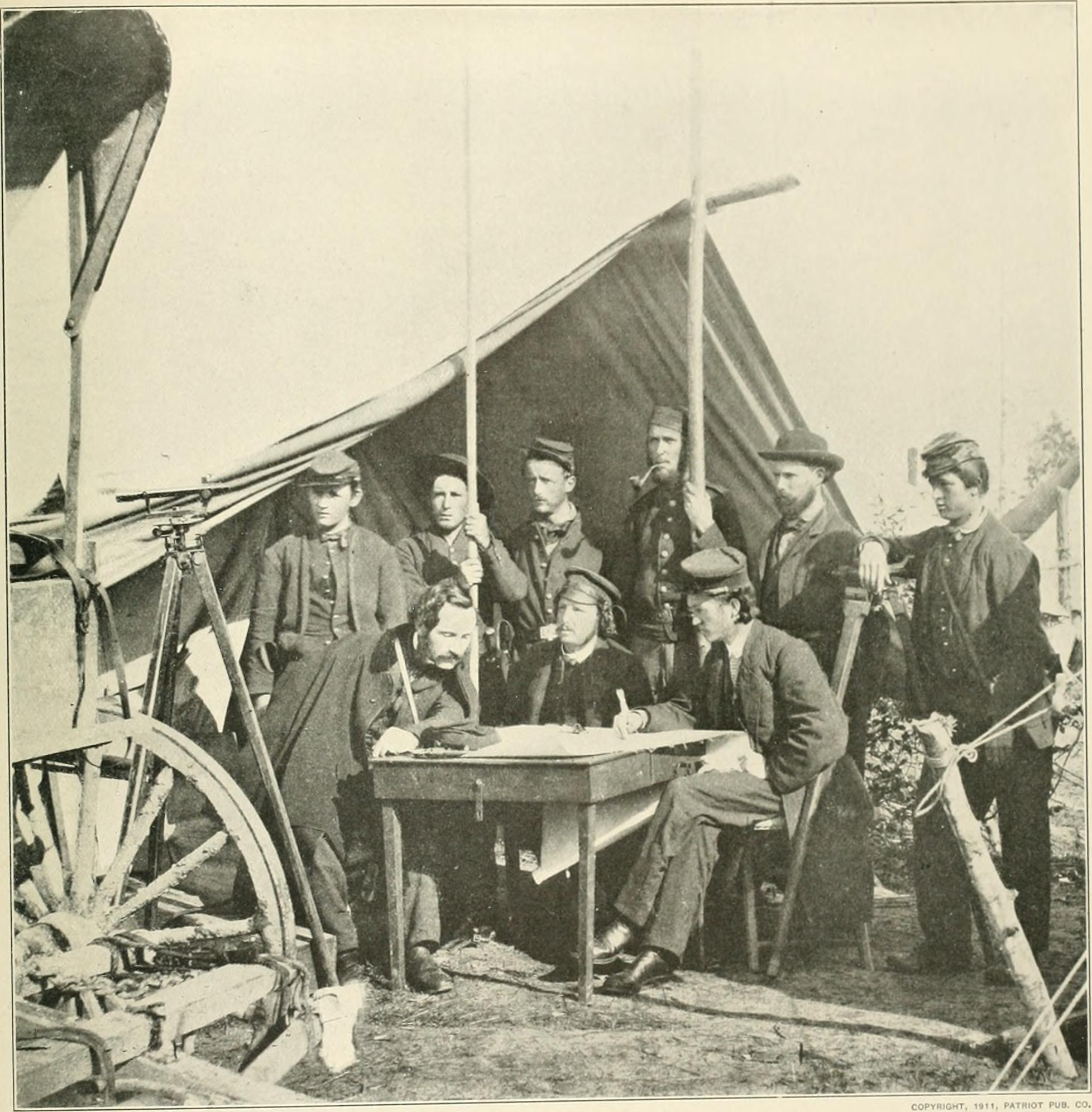
Topographical Engineers at work during the Yorktown campaign, May 1862.

- Joseph Nicolas Nicollet, assisted by Second Lieutenant in the Corps of Topographical Engineers, John Charles Fremont, conducted a reconnaissance of the region of the Upper Mississippi River and Missouri Rivers in 1838 and 1839.
- Boundary survey of the border between Wisconsin Territory and Michigan (1840–1841) conducted by Captain Thomas J. Cram.
- Boundary survey of the border with Republic of Texas (1841–42) by Maj. James Duncan Graham. Later discovered lunar tides in the Great Lakes in 1858–59.
- Fremont conducted expeditions over the Oregon Trail to the Columbia River and to California during 1842–1846. During his third expedition, Fremont detached Lieutenants James W. Abert and William G. Peck in August 1845, at Bent's Fort on the Arkansas River to survey Purgatory Creek and the Canadian and False Washita Rivers.
- Boundary survey of the Canada–US border (1844–46) led by William H. Emory.
- Military Reconnaissance from Fort Leavenworth in Missouri to San Diego in California, Including Part Of The Arkansas, Del Norte, and Gila Rivers. By Lieut. Col. W. H. Emory, made in 1846-7, With the Advanced Guard of the "Army of the West" led by Brigadier General Stephen W. Kearny.
- Boundary survey of the borders with Mexico; United States and Mexican Boundary Survey (1848–1855) led by William H. Emory.
- George H. Derby led three major topographical survey expeditions of the newly acquired lands of California in 1849 and 1850. This was followed by an expedition to find a water-based route from San Diego to Fort Yuma via the Gulf of California and the Colorado River in 1850-51.
- Lorenzo Sitgreaves led the first topographical mission across Arizona in 1851.
- Lt. Col. J. D. Graham was on the first resurvey of the Mason–Dixon line, from 1849 to 1850. At some point, Graham was to replace the Delaware-Maryland-Pennsylvania Tri-State Marker, but misplaced it.
- Pacific Railroad Surveys, which consisted of five surveys to find potential transcontinental railroad routes. These survey reports were compiled into twelve volumes, Reports of Explorations and Surveys, to ascertain the most practicable and economical route for a railroad from the Mississippi River to the Pacific Ocean, made under the direction of the Secretary of War, in 1853-4. Volumes I-XII, Washington, Government Printing Office, 1855–61.
  - The Northern Pacific survey followed between the 47th parallel north and 49th parallel north from St. Paul, Minnesota to the Puget Sound and was led by the newly appointed governor of the Washington Territory, Isaac Stevens. Accompanying Stevens were Captain George B. McClellan with Lt. Sylvester Mowry out of the Columbia Barracks from the west and Lt. Rufus Saxton with Lt. Richard Arnold out of St. Marysville from the east.
  - There were two Central Pacific surveys. One followed between the 37th parallel north and 39th parallel north from St. Louis, Missouri to San Francisco, California. This survey was led by Lt. John Williams Gunnison until his death at the hands of a band of Pahvants in Utah. Lt. Edward Griffin Beckwith then took command. Also participating in this survey was Frederick W. von Egloffstein, George Stoneman and Lt. Gouverneur K. Warren. Beckwith, subsequently explored the second Central Pacific route near the 41st parallel. This was the route subsequently closely followed by the Central Pacific and Union Pacific to complete the first transcontinental railroad.
  - There were two Southern Pacific surveys. One along the 35th parallel north from Oklahoma to Los Angeles, California, a route similar to the western part of the later Santa Fe Railroad and to Interstate 40, which was led by Lt. Amiel Weeks Whipple. Joseph Christmas Ives, Whipple's assistant, led the expedition that explored and mapped the Colorado River to the mouth of Las Vegas Wash. The southernmost Southern Pacific survey went across Texas to San Diego, California, a route which was later followed by the Southern Pacific Railroad which completed the second transcontinental railway in 1881. This survey was led by Lt. John Parke and John Pope.
  - The fifth survey was along the Pacific coast from San Diego to Seattle, Washington conducted by Lt. Robert S. Williamson and John G. Parke.
- Exploration of the Colorado River of the West by Lt. Joseph Christmas Ives, 1858–59
- Boundary survey of the borders with Canada, The Northwest Boundary Survey (1857–61)

== See also ==
- Army Geospatial Center
