= Lorenzo Sitgreaves =

American military officer (1810–1888)

Lorenzo I. Sitgreaves
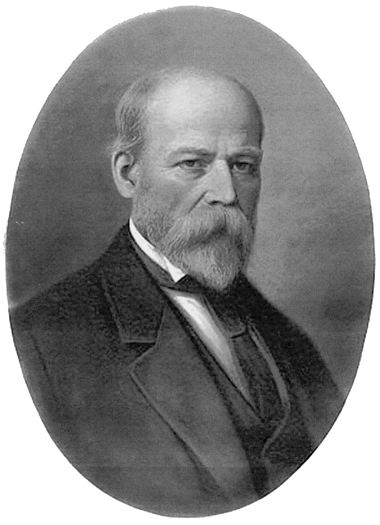
- Lorenzo Sitgreaves
- Born: March 15, 1810; Easton, Pennsylvania, U.S.
- Died: May 14, 1888 (aged 78); Washington, D.C., U.S.
- Burial place: Oak Hill Cemetery; Washington, D.C., U.S.
- Alma mater: United States Military Academy
- Spouse: Lucy Ann Jesup (m. 1854)
- Children: 2
- Military career
- Allegiance: United States of America; Union
- Branch: United States Army; Union Army
- Service years: 1827–1836, 1838–1866
- Rank: Lieutenant colonel
- Units: 1st Regiment of Artillery (1832–1836); Corps of Topographical Engineers (1838–1866)
- Known for: Leading the Sitgreaves Expedition
- Conflicts: Mexican–American War; Battle of Buena Vista; American Civil War

Lorenzo I. Sitgreaves (March 15, 1810 – May 14, 1888) was a U.S. Army officer from Pennsylvania who led the 1851 Sitgreaves Expedition down the Zuñi and Colorado rivers.

== Early life and career ==
Lorenzo I. Sitgreaves was born on March 15, 1810, in Easton, Pennsylvania, the son of Mary (née Kemper) and Samuel Sitgreaves. His mother was born to Daniel Kemper, a colonel in the American Revolutionary War. He was a cadet at the United States Military Academy, West Point, New York, from July 1, 1827, to July 1, 1832, when he graduated 25th in his class of 45. He was appointed Brevet 2nd Lieutenant of the 1st Regiment of Artillery, July 1, 1832. He served on the Black Hawk Expedition of 1832, but not at the seat of war. Later that year he served in the garrison at the Bellona Arsenal in Chesterfield County, Virginia, and from 1832 to 1833 in a garrison in the Creek Nation, until he was promoted Second Lieutenant, 1st Artillery, September 30, 1833. Transferred, he served in garrison at Fort Monroe, Virginia, in 1833–34, then from 1834 to 1836 again in the Creek Nation, until he resigned his commission on August 31, 1836. From 1836 to 1838, he was a civil engineer.

== Corps of Topographical Engineers ==
Sitgreaves was again appointed a 2nd Lieutenant in the Corps of Topographical Engineers on July 7, 1838. As Assistant Topographic Engineer he served in the construction of roads in Wisconsin from 1839 to 1840, and on a survey of Sault Ste. Marie, 1840-41 during which he was promoted to 1st Lieutenant, Corps of Topographic Engineers, July 18, 1840. He then served as an Assistant Topographic Engineer in surveying the U.S. border with Texas in 1841 and near New Orleans in 1841–42. In 1842-43 he served as an assistant in the Topographical Bureau in Washington, D.C. Returning to the field from 1843 to 1844, he was Assistant Topographic Engineer in the improvement of the Hudson River, and in the 1844-45 survey of the harbor of Portsmouth, New Hampshire, and of the reefs of Florida in 1845–46.

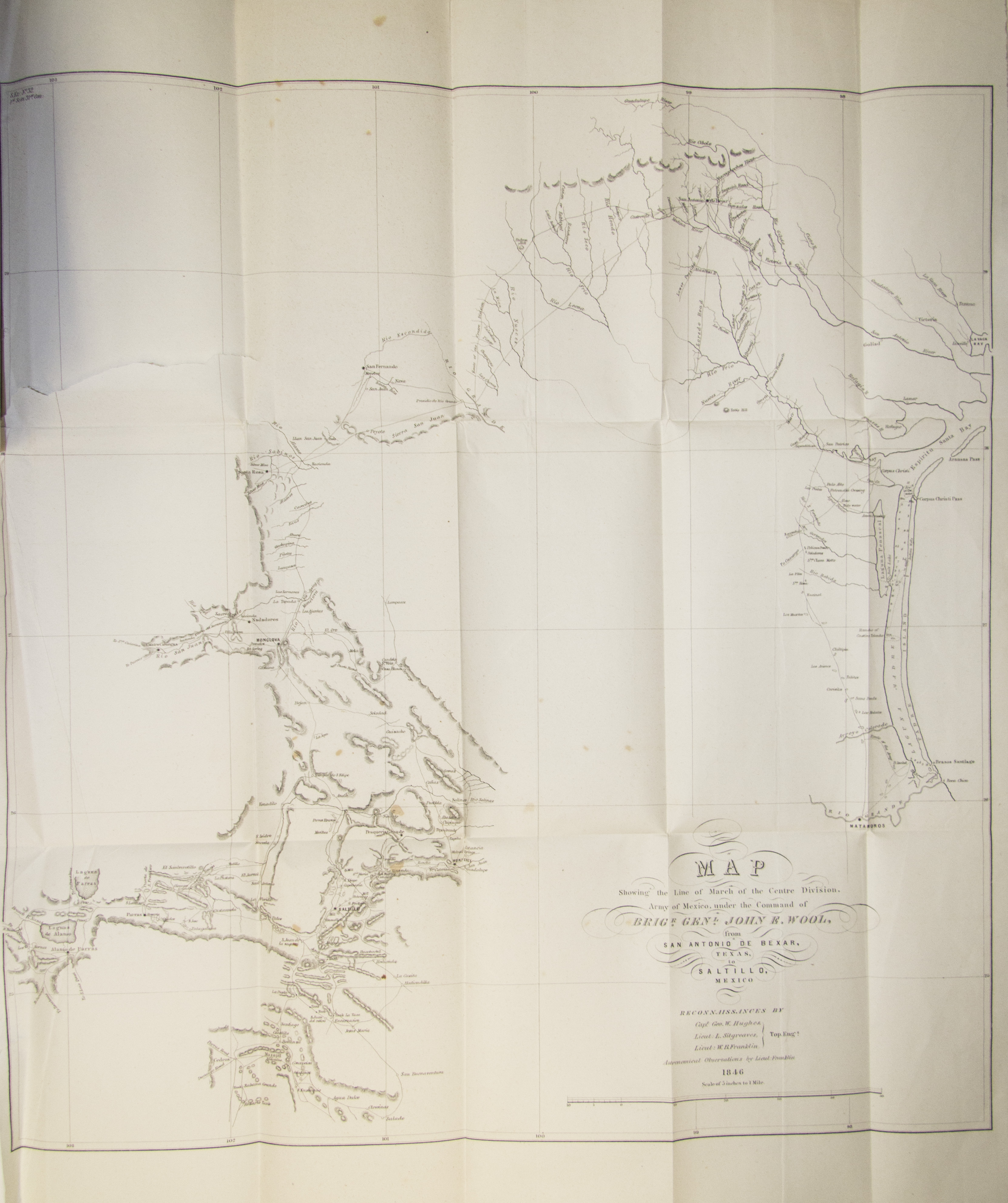
Hughes, Sitgreaves, and Franklin's Map Showing the Line of March of the Centre Division, Army of Mexico, under the Command of Brigr. Genl. John E. Wool, from San Antonio de Bexar, Texas, to Saltillo, Mexico, 1846-1850

During the Mexican–American War, Sitgreaves marched with Gen. John E. Wool from San Antonio through Chihuahua in the fall of 1846, and helped map the route and the region. He fought in the Battle of Buena Vista, February 22–23, 1847, for which he was promoted to Brevet Captain on February 23, 1847, for "Gallant and Meritorious Conduct" in the battle. When peace returned, he was put in charge of the Boundary Survey of the Creek Indian Territory in 1849 and then again was Assistant in the Topographical Bureau, at Washington, D.C., in 1850.

In 1851, Brevet Captain Sitgreaves led an expedition down the Zuni River and westward to the Colorado River, with John G. Parke his second in command and Antoine Leroux as his guide. This expedition was the first systematic survey of the area of the upper region of New Mexico Territory between Zuñi Pueblo and the Colorado River, in search of a route to California. The trip took from September 4 to November 30, 1851, between Zuñi and the Yuma Crossing.

Following the expedition, he spent most of 1852 preparing a report on the expedition, which was published in 1853. Soon afterward, on March 3, 1853, he was promoted to captain, Corps of Topographical Engineers, after 14 years of continuous service in the Corps.

Sitgreaves married Lucy Ann Jesup, daughter of Thomas S. Jesup, on February 28, 1854. They had two daughters: Mary Jesup and Lucy.

He served as Light-House Inspector, 11th District (Detroit, Michigan), from December 21, 1852, to December 11, 1856, and as Light-House Engineer in the 5th District (Baltimore), from May 15, 1857, to August 8, 1859. He was on a sick leave of absence from August 1859 to 1861.

Recalled at the start of the Civil War, he served as Mustering Officer at Albany, New York, in 1861–62, then as Superintendent of Volunteer Recruiting Service and Disbursing Officer at Madison, Wisconsin from April 20, 1863, to October 20, 1864. During this time he was promoted to Major, Corps of Topographical Engineers, on March 3, 1863, and to Lieutenant‑Colonel, Corps of Engineers, on April 22, 1864. He conducted the inspection of the temporary defenses in Kansas and Nebraska from October 25, 1864, to July 1865.

== Later life ==
When the Civil War ended, Sitgreaves was placed in charge of the harbor improvements on Lake Michigan, from August 3, 1865, to June 11, 1866. Sitgreaves retired from active service on July 10, 1866, on account of "Disability, resulting from Long and Faithful Service, and Disease contracted in the Line of Duty". In March 1867, he was appointed as a commissioner to settle Ohio and Indiana war claims.

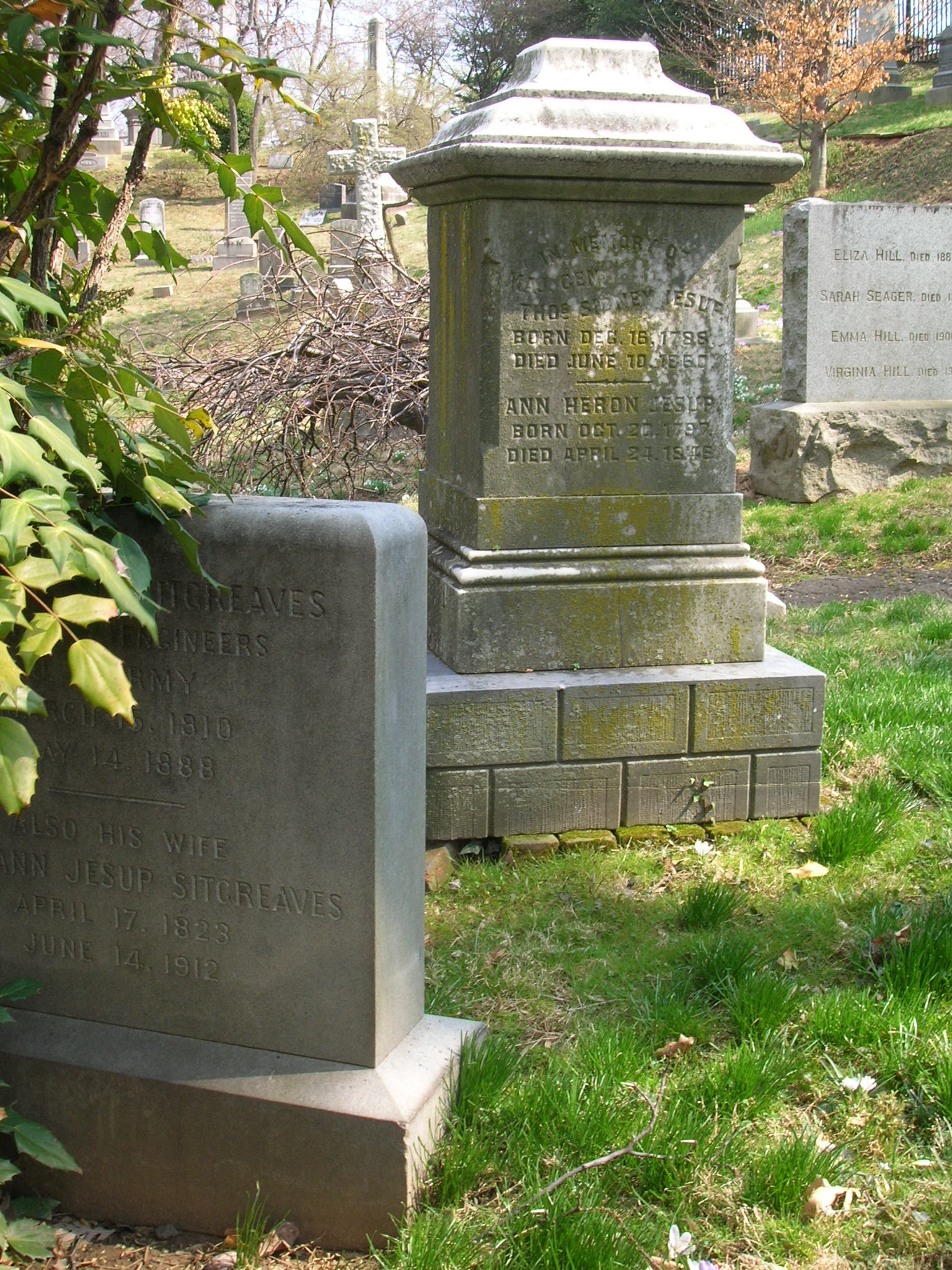
Grave of Sitgreaves (left) at Oak Hill Cemetery

Sitgreaves died at home on May 14, 1888, at 1300 N Street in Washington, D.C., and was buried at Oak Hill Cemetery.
