= Terry College of Business =

Constituent college of the University of Georgia in Athens, Georgia, USA

Coordinates: 33.95258°N 83.37708°W

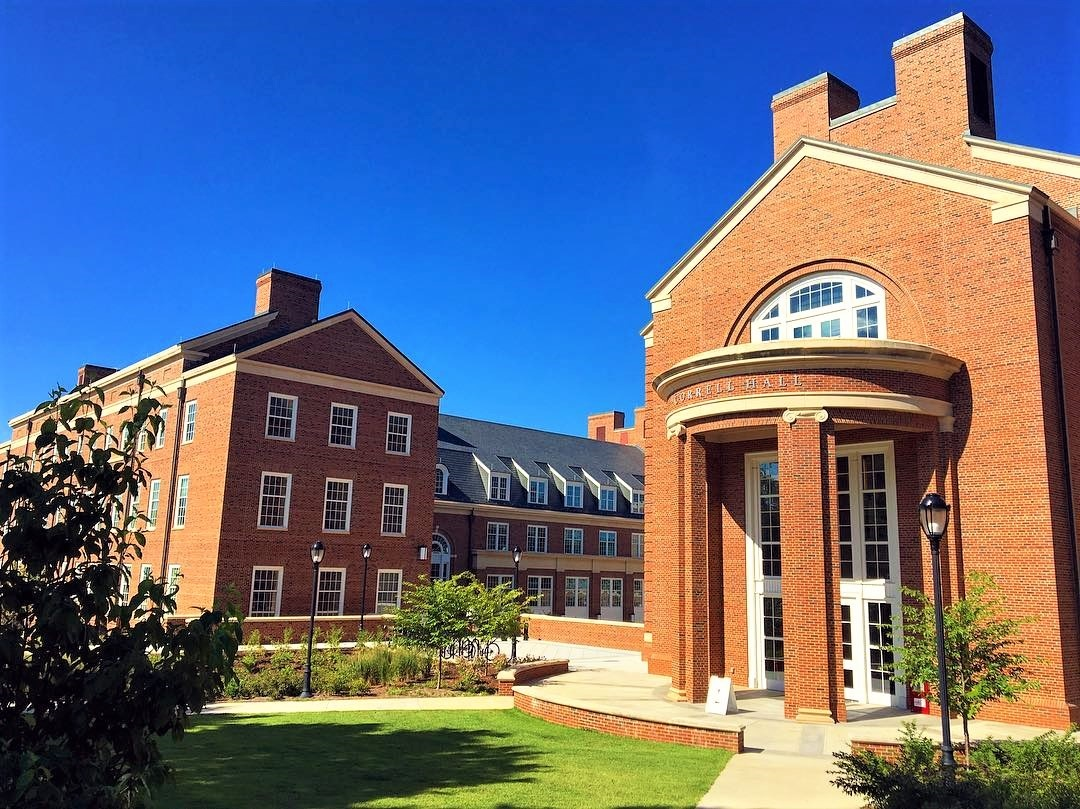
- Type: Public business school
- Established: 1912; 114 years ago
- Affiliations: University of Georgia
- Dean: Santanu Chatterjee
- Faculty: 206 (full-time)
- Students: 10,927
- Undergraduates: 9,589
- Postgraduates: 1,338
- Location: Athens, Georgia, US
- Website: terry.uga.edu

The C. Herman and Mary Virginia Terry College of Business is a constituent college of the University of Georgia, an R1: Doctoral research university in Athens, Georgia, United States. The business college offers undergraduate programs, MBA programs, specialized master's programs, and doctoral programs. It was founded as the first business school in the American South in 1912.

The Terry MBA is offered as a full-time degree on campus in Athens, as a part-time degree or Executive MBA in the Buckhead district of Atlanta, and a fully online MBA option was added in 2023.

All of the college's programs are accredited by AACSB International – the Association to Advance Collegiate Schools of Business.

== Degrees programs ==
In Athens, the Terry College offers an undergraduate program, four master's degrees (the Full-Time MBA, the Master of Accountancy, the Master of Marketing Research, and the Master of Science in Business Analytics), and eight doctoral degree tracks. It offers three online degrees: an MBA, a Master of Science in Business and Artificial Intelligence, and a Master of Professional Accountancy (MPAcc) for working professionals with non-accounting backgrounds. The Terry College also offers Executive MBA and Professional MBA programs at the Terry Executive Education Center in Atlanta.

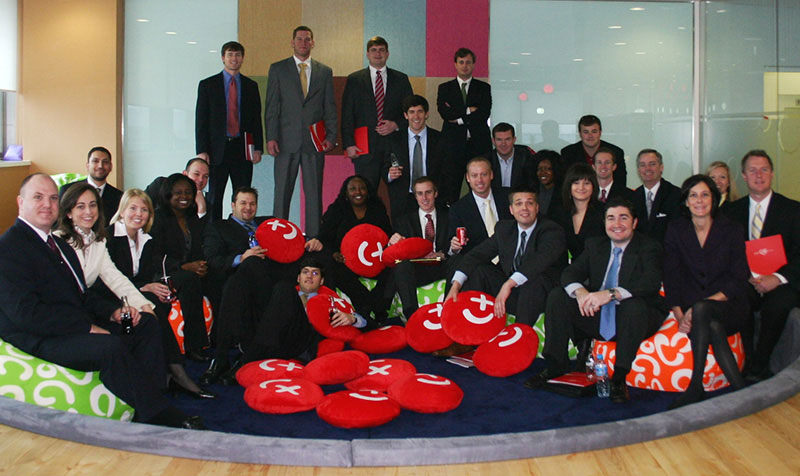
Terry MBAs on an International Business program trip to China

=== Undergraduate majors ===
The Terry College offers undergraduate majors in accounting, economics, finance, management, management information systems, marketing, real estate, risk management/insurance, and a co-major in international business. All UGA students who plan to pursue a bachelor's degree in business are initially admitted to the Terry College as intended-business majors. Students can apply to a Terry major once they meet all application eligibility requirements, typically during their second year at UGA.

Undergraduates can supplement their degree program with one or more certificates, which are proof of skills development offered in eight areas of specialization: actuarial science, entrepreneurship, FinTech, legal studies, music business, personal and organizational leadership, sustainability, and workforce diversity. There is also an academic minor in business available to UGA undergraduates.

=== Full-time MBA ===
The Terry Full-Time MBA degree program is taught on the Athens campus, with staff, team rooms, and classrooms headquartered in Correll Hall. The curriculum is delivered in four semesters. MBA students are encouraged to complete an internship during the summer semester between their first and second year. The MBA Career Management Center assists with internships, job placement, career coaching, and networking events.

The first-year core curriculum provides a solid foundation of management principles and business practices. Students focus their second-year curriculum on a choice of nine market-driven specializations and three additional areas of focus. A total of 61 credit hours are required for graduation, including 1 credit for community service.

Admission to the full-time program is highly competitive, with an acceptance rate of 35%. Students entering the program averaged a 698 GMAT score, with the middle 80 percent of scores ranging up to 740. More than 97% of students are employed within three months of graduation.

=== Part-time and online MBA ===
In addition to the full-time program in Athens, the Terry College has three MBA formats designed for working professionals — people who plan to work full-time as they pursue their MBA degrees part-time.

Terry's Executive MBA is geared toward mid- to senior-level managers with a minimum of seven years of work experience. Instruction is delivered 50% remotely and 50% in person on weekends in Atlanta, and the program is completed in 18 months.

Terry's Professional MBA is designed for early- to mid-career professionals. PMBA class schedules are offered on either weekday evenings or Saturday-only in Atlanta. Terry's PMBA program can be completed in 17, 20, or 23 months.

Terry's Online MBA is taught 100% virtually and asynchronously. The OMBA curriculum is very similar to the PMBA program. Terry’s OMBA also can be completed in 17, 20, or 23 months.

=== Other master's degree programs ===
- Master of Accountancy
- Master of Professional Accountancy (Online)
- Master of Marketing Research
- Master of Science in Business Analytics
- Master of Science in Business and Artificial Intelligence (Online)

=== Doctoral programs ===
- Accounting
- Economics
- Finance
- Management
- Management Information Systems
- Marketing
- Real Estate
- Risk Management and Insurance

== Certificates ==
=== Leadership ===
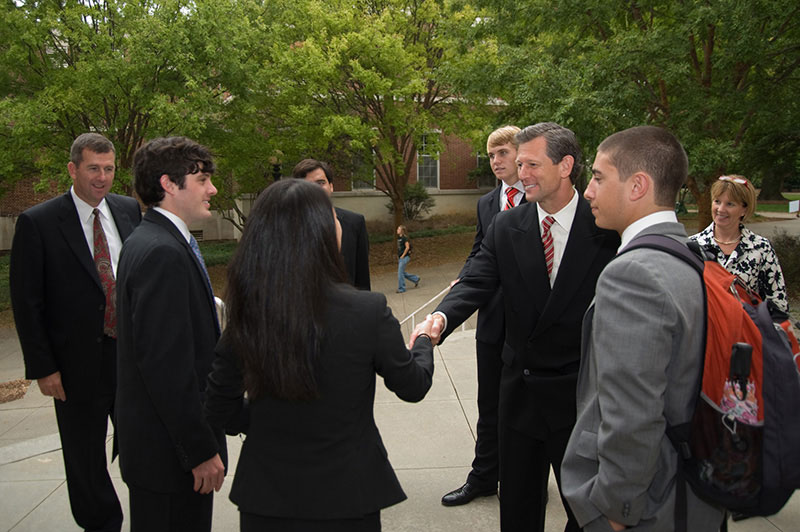
Former Viacom executive Jimmy Barge meets with students following his Terry Leadership Speaker Series presentation, January 2010.

The Institute for Leadership Advancement (ILA) in the Terry College of Business was established in 2001. ILA provides students with self-assessments, coaching/mentoring, action learning and feedback focused on the development of greater emotional competence. Two undergraduate leadership programs form the centerpiece of ILA programming: the Leonard Leadership Scholars Program (for Terry College majors) and the Leadership Fellows Program (for students in any UGA major). Completion of either program earns the student a certificate in Personal and Organizational Leadership.

ILA hosts the Terry Leadership Speaker Series, which brings well-known leaders from a variety of organizations to the Terry College of Business. In these student-oriented forums, leaders are asked to discuss their leadership styles and experiences.

=== Music Business ===
The Music Business Certificate Program was launched in January 2006 as a response to the growing music and entertainment industry in the state of Georgia. In starting the program, former director Bruce Burch often said Atlanta is now recognized as the "fourth music center" in the country behind New York, Los Angeles, and Nashville, and is growing rapidly as a hotbed for music and film production. Since August 2010, the program has been under the leadership of Athens-based musician and producer/engineer David Barbe.

Students can earn an interdisciplinary certificate in music business by receiving a hands-on education about subjects like music and business fundamentals, copyright issues, creative content, artist management and production and technology. Music and entertainment industry executives are brought in from across the country to speak to classes, providing not only "real world" perspective, but also networking opportunities. Only 100 students are annually enrolled in the program.

=== Actuarial Science ===
The Actuarial Science Certificate Program is designed to prepare students for an actuarial career. Actuaries apply mathematical models to assess the financial cost of uncertainty. There is a high demand for actuaries across all industries. This certificate program is open to all undergraduate students currently enrolled at UGA.

=== Legal Studies ===
This certificate program prepares students for the complex legal environment of business and helps them also to gauge their interest in pursuing a Juris Doctor degree. To obtain the certificate students must complete 15 course hours with a minimum grade of C (2.00) in those courses. A number of pre-requisite courses are necessary before this program may be undertaken.

== Entrepreneurship ==
The Entrepreneurship Program is a campuswide initiative that is housed in the Terry College of Business and open to all UGA students, regardless of their major or area of study. The program focuses on the four key tasks of entrepreneurship: opportunity identification, resource acquisition and deployment, goal setting and strategy formulation, and implementation. This highly active concentration hosts a multitude of seminars and events on and off the UGA campus, including "UGA's Next Top Entrepreneur Competition" and "UGA Startups."

UGA's Next Top Entrepreneur was dubbed the "American Idol" of business plan competitions. Both a competition and a seminar series lasting the full academic year, it is open to all UGA students. Competitors participate in a series of interactive seminars and individual coaching sessions focused on starting a business. The first year of competition (2008–09) resulted in eight businesses being launched, $212,000 of initial revenue, and procurement of angel funding.

The UGA Startups series was designed for entrepreneurs to have access to some of the most seasoned entrepreneurs in the Southeast. Topics include innovation, funding, opportunity analysis, business communications, purchasing businesses, and franchising. UGA Startups events are held at the Terry Executive Education Center.

== Executive programs ==
Terry Executive Programs offer business professionals value-added education with certification and development programs in areas such as financial planning certification, human resources leadership, project management, and business analysis.

== Business Analytics Institute ==
The M. Douglas and V. Kay Ivester Institute for Business Analytics and Insights is an academic program that expands analytics throughout Terry's different areas of business education by targeting and expanding the business school's process of transforming historical business data into insights to improve business decisions by focusing on areas including, but not limited to, data management, data visualization, predictive modeling, data mining, forecasting simulation, and optimization that are some of the tools used to create insights from data. The Institute involves several academic areas, pursues interdisciplinary research involving both students and faculty, involves the business community, and advances new programs and courses.

== Selig Center for Economic Growth ==
Dedicated in December 1990, the Selig Center improves upon its predecessor, the Division of Research, which was established in the late 1940s.

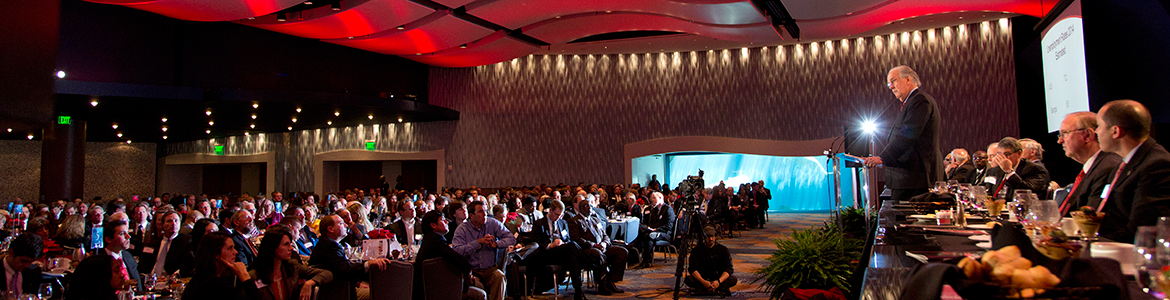
UGA President Emeritus Charles B. Knapp delivers the economic forecast for 2014 to regional business leaders at the Georgia Economic Outlook Series.

its projects include— economic impact studies, economic forecasts, publications, information services, and data products .

=== Georgia Economic Outlook Series ===
Each year the Terry College hosts the Georgia Economic Outlook series in 12 cities throughout the state. The series provides more than 3,000 business and government leaders the foundation to make informed decisions based on economic data from the Selig Center for Economic Growth.

== Rankings ==
Business school rankings

United States
- Bloomberg MBA: No.23
- USNWR MBA: No.25 out of 452

Global
- Financial Times MBA: No.60 and No.1 best-value

=== Undergraduate programs ===
- Ranked 24th undergraduate business program by U.S. News & World Report in 2027 Best Colleges editionout of 535 ranked undergraduate programs.
  - 2nd for Risk Management and Insurance
  - 5th for Real Estate
  - 11th for Management Information Systems
  - 24th for Accounting
  - 28th for Management
  - 28th for Marketing
  - 30th for Analytics
  - 42nd for Finance
- 8th overall by Niche Best Colleges for Business, 2027
  - 7th overall by Niche Best Colleges for Accounting and Finance

=== Graduate programs ===
Full-time MBA

- 23rd overall by Bloomberg Businessweek, 2026-27
- 25th overall by U.S. News & World Report, 2026
- #1 global value for the money by the Financial Times, 2026

Executive MBA

- 12th overall by Fortune, 2024

Professional MBA

- 13th overall by Fortune, 2024

Business and Artificial Intelligence (Online)

- 23rd overall by U.S. News & World Report, 2026

== Campuses ==
=== Athens ===
On the University of Georgia’s main campus, the Terry College of Business is housed in the Business Learning Community, which is situated at the center of UGA’s 760-acre campus next to the intersection of Lumpkin and Baxter streets. The Terry College’s state-of-the-art home is a modern, collaborative, learning, teaching and working environment for students, faculty and staff.

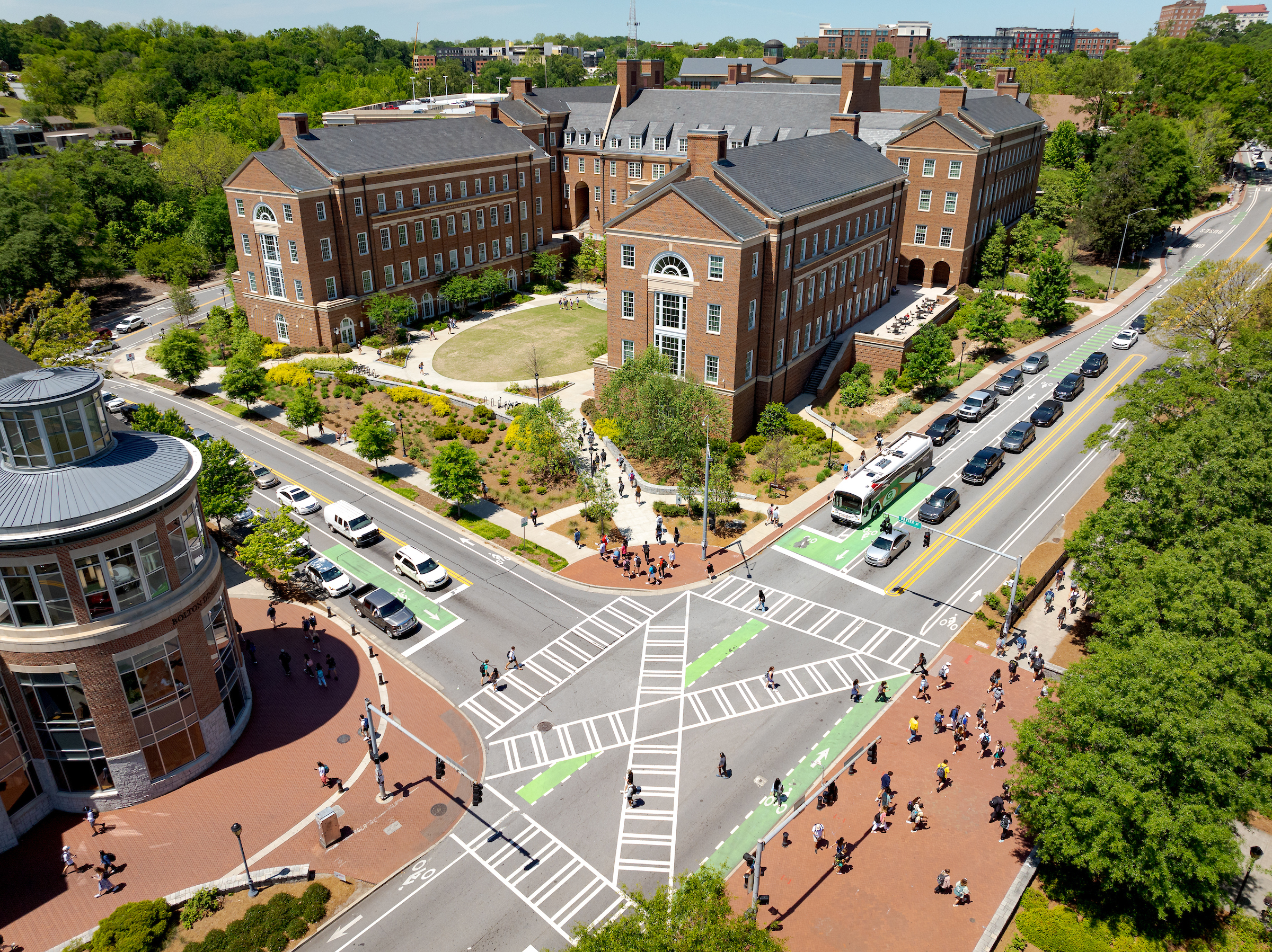
Construction of UGA’s Business Learning Community was completed in 2019.

The complex of six buildings was jointly funded through a partnership between the state of Georgia and private donors. Correll Hall was the first building to open in 2015. The next phase, which included Amos Hall, Benson Hall, and Moore-Rooker Hall, opened two years later. The third and final phase of construction was completed in 2019. It features two buildings — Ivester Hall and Sanford and Barbara Orkin Hall — separated by the Coca-Cola Plaza.

One block north of the Business Learning Community at the edge of downtown Athens, Studio 225 is home to the UGA Entrepreneurship Program, which is taught and led by business faculty. Located on West Broad Street, Studio 225 includes a mix of offices and multipurpose educational areas — such as a maker space, a pitch deck and study nooks — where students interested in entrepreneurship can meet, collaborate and form teams.

Pre-dating construction of the Business Learning Community, the Terry College of Business was formerly located in three buildings on the University of Georgia’s historic North Campus: Brooks Hall, Sanford Hall and Caldwell Hall.

Brooks Hall, designed by architect Neel Reid, was originally known as the Commerce-Journalism Building before being renamed in 1974 for Robert Preston Brooks, who was UGA’s first Rhodes Scholar and the School of Commerce’s first dean, serving from 1920 to 1945. Construction of the building was completed in 1928, with a three-story annex added in 1972. The original structure was seriously damaged by fire in 1995 and restored a year later.

Sanford Hall was funded through private gifts and dedicated in 1997. The three-story building opened with 15 classrooms, a student advising center, and a student lounge. UGA alumnus Charles S. Sanford Jr. gave the largest donation for the building that bears his family’s name.

Caldwell Hall was built in 1981. The classroom building is named for Harmon W. Caldwell, a UGA alumnus who served as university president from 1935 to 1948 and chancellor of the University System of Georgia from 1948 to 1964.

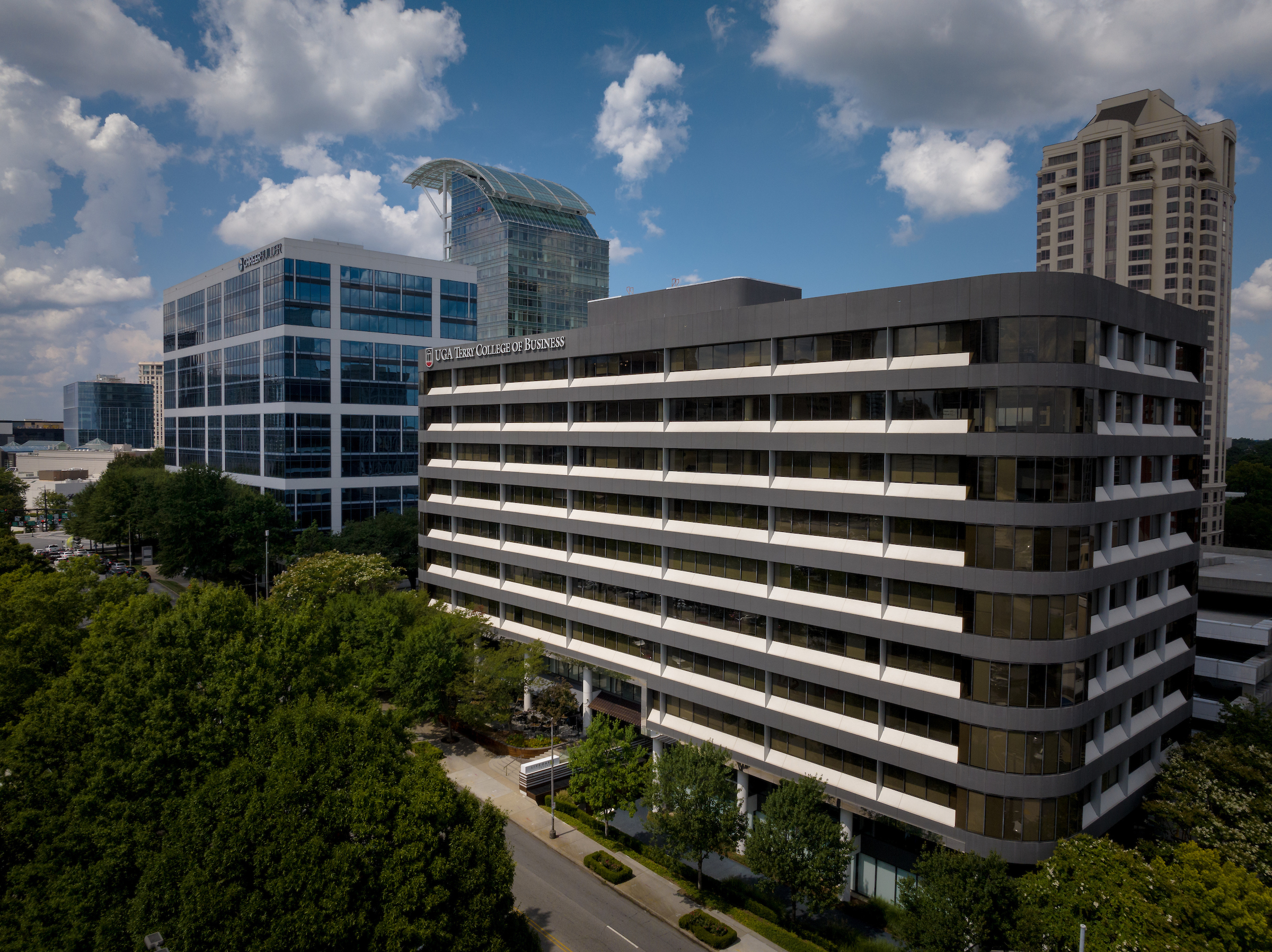
The Terry Executive Education Center in Atlanta.

=== Atlanta ===
The Terry College of Business has two satellite campuses located in Griffin and Atlanta, Georgia.

The Terry College's "home away from home" in Atlanta is the Terry Executive Education Center, located in the Buckhead business district.

Classes for the college's Executive and Professional MBA programs are taught at the center, in addition to non-degree programs, such as Lean Six Sigma and Financial Planning Certification. The center also serves as a focal point and meeting place for Terry students, alumni, faculty, and staff to interact with Atlanta's business community. The 38,000-square-foot facility located inside Live Oak Square on Lenox Road features tiered executive classrooms, conference rooms, break-out meeting spaces and interview suites.

UGA's Griffin campus, located 40 miles (64 km) south of Atlanta, was established as the Georgia Experiment Station in 1888. UGA Griffin offers graduate degree programs and undergraduate degree completion programs, including a bachelor's degree in general business from Terry.

== Notable alumni ==
- Bernard B. Ramsey (BSC 1937) – senior vice president and chair of the executive committee of Merrill Lynch
- Thomas G. Cousins (BBA 1952) – real estate developer, former pro sports franchise owner, philanthropist, and a founder (with Warren Buffett and Julian Robertson) of Purpose Built Communities
- Frank W. "Sonny" Seiler (BBA 1956, JD 1957) – trial attorney; had a leading role in the book and movie Midnight in the Garden of Good and Evil (New York Times Best-Seller); Seiler family owns the line of white English Bulldogs that have served as UGA's mascots
- A.D. "Pete" Correll (BBA 1963) – chairman emeritus of Georgia-Pacific; chairman of Grady Memorial Hospital Corp.; director of Truist Financial Corporation, Mirant and Norfolk Southern
- Robert D. McTeer (BBA 1963, PhD 1971) – president of the Federal Reserve Bank of Dallas and chancellor of the Texas A&M University System
- Phil Gramm (BBA 1964, PhD 1967) – economist, U.S. Representative (1979–1985), and U.S. Senator (1985–2002) from Texas
- Saxby Chambliss (BBA 1966) – lawyer, U.S. Representative (1995–2003), and U.S. Senator (2003–2015) from Georgia
- Johnny Isakson (BBA 1966) – real estate executive, served in the Georgia General Assembly, as a U.S. Representative (1999-2005) and U.S. Senator (2005-2019) from Georgia
- M. Douglas Ivester (BBA 1969) – chairman and CEO of the Coca-Cola Company
- Thomas J. Stanley (PhD 1969) – business professor and writer who was the author and co-author of several award-winning books on America's wealthy, including the New York Times’ best sellers The Millionaire Next Door and The Millionaire Mind
- Gary C. Butler (MBA 1970) – president and CEO of Automatic Data Processing
- Mason Hawkins (MBA 1971) – founder, chairman and CEO of Southeastern Asset Management
- Daniel P. Amos (BBA 1973) – chairman and CEO of Aflac
- Steve C. Jones (BBA 1978, JD 1987) – appointed in 2011 as judge to the U.S. District Court
- M. Michele Burns (BBA 1979, MAcc 1980) – chairman and CEO of Mercer and director of Cisco Systems, Wal-Mart, and Goldman Sachs
- Frank Hanna III (BBA 1983, JD 1986) – entrepreneur, merchant banker, philanthropist, and Knight of the Grand Cross of the Order of St. Gregory the Great
- Bryan Calhoun (BBA 1992) – vice president of new media and external affairs at SoundExchange
- Sheila Taormina (BBA 1992, MBA 1994) – four-time U.S. Olympian in swimming, triathlon and modern pentathlon
- Kirby Smart (BBA 1998) – head football coach of the Georgia Bulldogs
- Tope Awotona (BBA 2002) – tech entrepreneur, founder and CEO of Calendly, one of the richest Black Billionaires
- Dave Haywood (BBA 2004) – musician and a founder of country music group Lady A
- Charles Kelley (BBA 2004) – musician and a founder of country music group Lady A
- Mike Macdonald (BBA 2010) – head coach of the Seattle Seahawks
- Brian Harman (BBA 2011) – championship golfer on the PGA Tour
- Maria Taylor (ABJ 2009, MBA 2013) – sportscaster for NBC Sports and previously ESPN and the SEC Network
- Sepp Straka (BBA 2015) – professional golfer on the PGA Tour
- Megan Moroney (BBA 2020) – Nashville singer and songwriter

== History ==
First established in 1912 by the state’s Board of Regents, the business school was named the School of Commerce until 1940. The early years of the school were "fragile" as the program struggled to secure the faculty and funding needed to serve the several students who had declared their intention to pursue the new Bachelor of Science in Commerce degree. The first such degree was awarded in 1915 to Willis Brazeal Sparks Jr. The first woman to receive a degree in commerce from UGA was Anne Ruth Moore in 1922. And in 1966, Harold A. Black and Tyrone Barnett were the first Black students to graduate from the college.

The school was known as the College of Business Administration from 1940 until 1991, when it was renamed the C. Herman and Mary Virginia Terry College of Business. The name honors Mr. and Mrs. Terry, who were distinguished benefactors of the college and endowed faculty chairs, research fellowships, scholarships, and funded facility upgrades.

In its early years, business school enrollment was very small. In 1930, there were only 12 faculty members and 50 students in the graduating class. By 1965, total enrollment in the College of Business Administration was 2,091 and more than 500 degrees were conferred that year. By the turn of the century, undergraduate enrollment at Terry was 6,080 and graduate enrollment totaled 500 in the fall of 2000. And by 2024, the college had eclipsed 10,000 students enrolled, with 9,330 undergraduates and 1,255 graduate students. More than 3,100 students graduated with degrees in business during the 2023-2024 academic year.

The Terry College of Business and Tull School of Accounting are accredited by AACSB International. The college holds the distinction of being continuously accredited since 1926.

=== List of deans ===
- R.E. Curtis, Director (1912–1914)
- William A. Shelton, Director (1914–1918)
- H.D. Dozier, Acting Director (1918–1919)
- Howell A. Inghram, Director (1919–1920)
- Robert Preston Brooks, Dean (1920–1945)
- Alvin B. Biscoe, Dean (1945–1947)
- Robert T. Segrest, Acting Dean (1947–1948)
- James E. Gates, Dean (1948–1962)
- J. Whitney Bunting, Dean (1962–1968)
- Robert T. Segrest, Acting Dean (1968)
- William C. Flewellen Jr., Dean (1968–1982)
- Albert W. Niemi Jr., Dean (1982–1996)
- James Don Edwards, Interim Dean (1996–1998)
- P. George Benson, Dean (1998–2007)
- Robert E. Hoyt, Interim Dean (2007)
- Robert T. Sumichrast, Dean (2007–2013)
- Charles B. Knapp, Interim Dean (2013–2014)
- Benjamin C. Ayers, Dean (2014–2025)
- Santanu Chatterjee, Dean (2025–)

== See also ==
- List of United States business school rankings
- List of business schools in the United States
