= List of The New York Times number-one books of 1998 =

The American daily newspaper The New York Times publishes multiple weekly lists ranking the best selling books in the United States.

== Fiction ==
The following list ranks the number-one best selling fiction books, in the hardcover fiction category.

Date	Book	Author
January 4	Cold Mountain	Charles Frazier
January 11	Cold Mountain	Charles Frazier
January 18	Cold Mountain	Charles Frazier
January 25	Cold Mountain	Charles Frazier
February 1	Paradise	Toni Morrison
February 8	Paradise	Toni Morrison
February 15	Paradise	Toni Morrison
February 22	The Street Lawyer	John Grisham
March 1	The Street Lawyer	John Grisham
March 8	The Street Lawyer	John Grisham
March 15	The Street Lawyer	John Grisham
March 22	The Street Lawyer	John Grisham
March 29	The Street Lawyer	John Grisham
April 5	The Street Lawyer	John Grisham
April 12	The Street Lawyer	John Grisham
April 19	The Street Lawyer	John Grisham
April 26	The Long Road Home	Danielle Steel
May 3	The Long Road Home	Danielle Steel
May 10	You Belong to Me	Mary Higgins Clark
May 17	You Belong to Me	Mary Higgins Clark
May 24	You Belong to Me	Mary Higgins Clark
May 31	"N" Is for Noose	Sue Grafton
June 7	You Belong to Me	Mary Higgins Clark
June 14	A Widow for One Year	John Irving
June 21	A Widow for One Year	John Irving
June 28	A Widow for One Year	John Irving
July 5	I Know This Much Is True	Wally Lamb
July 12	The Klone and I	Danielle Steel
July 19	I Know This Much is True	Wally Lamb
July 26	Point of Origin	Patricia Cornwell
August 2	Point of Origin	Patricia Cornwell
August 9	I Know This Much is True	Wally Lamb
August 16	Point of Origin	Patricia Cornwell
August 23	Rainbow Six	Tom Clancy
August 30	Rainbow Six	Tom Clancy
September 6	Rainbow Six	Tom Clancy
September 13	Rainbow Six	Tom Clancy
September 20	Rainbow Six	Tom Clancy
September 27	Rainbow Six	Tom Clancy
October 4	Rainbow Six	Tom Clancy
October 11	Bag of Bones	Stephen King
October 18	Bag of Bones	Stephen King
October 25	Bag of Bones	Stephen King
November 1	Bag of Bones	Stephen King
November 8	The Path of Daggers	Robert Jordan
November 15	The Path of Daggers	Robert Jordan
November 22	A Man in Full	Tom Wolfe
November 29	A Man in Full	Tom Wolfe
December 6	A Man in Full	Tom Wolfe
December 13	A Man in Full	Tom Wolfe
December 20	A Man in Full	Tom Wolfe
December 27	A Man in Full	Tom Wolfe

== Nonfiction ==
The following list ranks the number-one best selling nonfiction books, in the hardcover nonfiction category.

Date	Book	Author
January 4	Midnight in the Garden of Good and Evil	John Berendt
January 11	Midnight in the Garden of Good and Evil	John Berendt
January 18	Midnight in the Garden of Good and Evil	John Berendt
January 25	Midnight in the Garden of Good and Evil	John Berendt
February 1	Midnight in the Garden of Good and Evil	John Berendt
February 8	Talking to Heaven	James Van Praagh
February 15	Talking to Heaven	James Van Praagh
February 22	Talking to Heaven	James Van Praagh
March 1	Talking to Heaven	James Van Praagh
March 8	Talking to Heaven	James Van Praagh
March 15	Talking to Heaven	James Van Praagh
March 22	Talking to Heaven	James Van Praagh
March 29	Talking to Heaven	James Van Praagh
April 5	Talking to Heaven	James Van Praagh
April 12	Talking to Heaven	James Van Praagh
April 19	Talking to Heaven	James Van Praagh
April 26	Tuesdays with Morrie	Mitch Albom
May 3	The Millionaire Next Door	Thomas J. Stanley and William D. Danko
May 10	Tuesdays with Morrie	Mitch Albom
May 17	Tuesdays with Morrie	Mitch Albom
May 24	We Are Our Mothers' Daughters	Cokie Roberts
May 31	Tuesdays with Morrie	Mitch Albom
June 7	Tuesdays with Morrie	Mitch Albom
June 14	Tuesdays with Morrie	Mitch Albom
June 21	Tuesdays with Morrie	Mitch Albom
June 28	A Pirate Looks at Fifty	Jimmy Buffett
July 5	A Pirate Looks at Fifty	Jimmy Buffett
July 12	A Pirate Looks at Fifty	Jimmy Buffett
July 19	A Pirate Looks at Fifty	Jimmy Buffett
July 26	A Pirate Looks at Fifty	Jimmy Buffett
August 2	Tuesdays with Morrie	Mitch Albom
August 9	Tuesdays with Morrie	Mitch Albom
August 16	Tuesdays with Morrie	Mitch Albom
August 23	Tuesdays with Morrie	Mitch Albom
August 30	Tuesdays with Morrie	Mitch Albom
September 6	Tuesdays with Morrie	Mitch Albom
September 13	The Day Diana Died	Christopher Andersen
September 20	The Day Diana Died	Christopher Andersen
September 27	The Day Diana Died	Christopher Andersen
October 4	The Death of Outrage	William J. Bennett
October 11	The Death of Outrage	William J. Bennett
October 18	Tuesdays with Morrie	Mitch Albom
October 25	Tuesdays with Morrie	Mitch Albom
November 1	The Death of Outrage	William J. Bennett
November 8	Tuesdays with Morrie	Mitch Albom
November 15	Tuesdays with Morrie	Mitch Albom
November 22	Tuesdays with Morrie	Mitch Albom
November 29	Tuesdays with Morrie	Mitch Albom
December 6	Tuesdays with Morrie	Mitch Albom
December 13	Tuesdays with Morrie	Mitch Albom
December 20	The Century	Peter Jennings and Todd Brewster
December 27	The Greatest Generation	Tom Brokaw

== See also ==
- Publishers Weekly list of bestselling novels in the United States in the 1990s
