= Allen Amason =

Strategic management professor

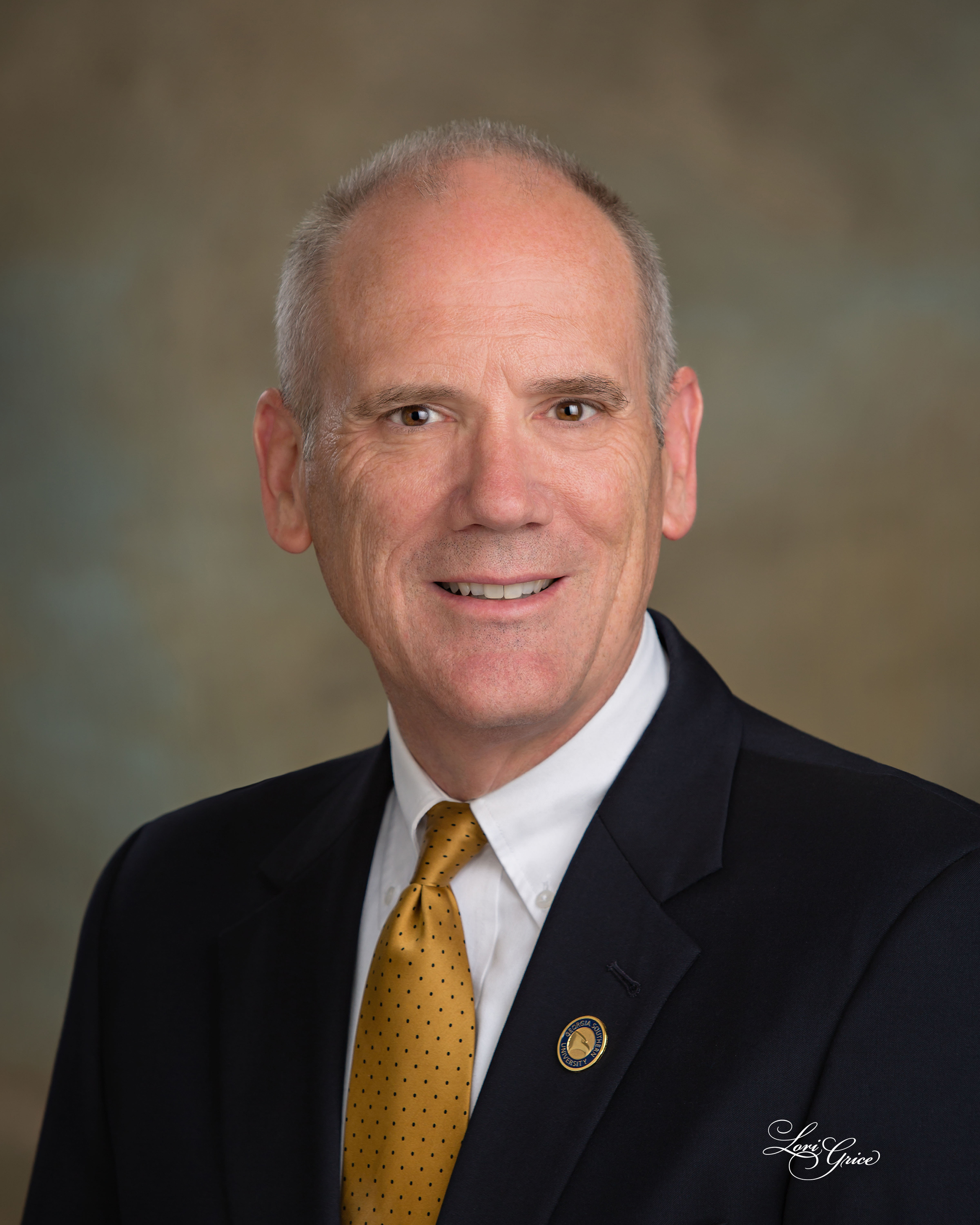
- Born: 1962; Atlanta
- Education: Georgia Southern University; University of South Carolina (PhD)
- Occupations: Professor; Dean Emeritus
- Employer(s): Parker College of Business, Georgia Southern University
- Known for: Strategic Management
- Notable work: Strategic Management: From Theory to Practice

Allen C. Amason is a retired professor and a consultant in strategic management and leadership. He is Dean Emeritus of the Parker College of Business at Georgia Southern University, and formerly a professor at the University of Georgia and Mississippi State University.

== Early life and education ==
Amason was born in Atlanta, Georgia, and raised near Brunswick, Georgia, where he attended high school at Glynn Academy, graduating in 1980. He received his bachelor's degree in finance in 1984 from Georgia Southern University and his PhD in strategic management and international business in 1993 from the Moore School of Business at the University of South Carolina.

== Academic career ==
=== Research and teaching ===
Amason began his academic career serving as an assistant professor of management at Mississippi State University, from 1993 to 1996. In 1996, he moved to the University of Georgia’s Terry College of Business, where he served until 2013. During those years, he built a strong reputation and record in strategic management, conducting research, teaching, and consulting on, the connections between managerial decision making and organizational outcomes and performance.

During this time, he served on the editorial review boards of multiple academic journals, as associate editor of the Journal of Management Studies, and the Journal of Management, and became a sought-after speaker and consultant, with expertise in business, management, and leadership. As a professor, he won multiple awards, built an active practice in consulting and executive coaching, and saw his citation count grow substantially, earning him a position on Stanford / Elsevier's annual list of the world's top scholars and researchers.

=== Administration and service ===
Amason became chair of the Department of Management at the Terry College, in 2006. During his tenure, the department became one of the top ranked management programs in the nation.In 2013, Amason left the University of Georgia to become Dean at the Parker College of Business at Georgia Southern University. As dean, he oversaw significant growth in enrollment, student outcomes, rankings, and programmatic reputation, as well as significant growth in fundraising. Since 2013, the Parker College has received over $13 million in gifts and pledges, including a $5 million gift from Greg Parker, the largest single cash gift in the history of the university. Under his leadership, the Parker College launched multiple high-impact learning programs, including Eagles on Wall Street, the Parker Business Scholars, Eagles on Penn Ave., Business Abroad, and Professional Development Day. Amason stepped down as dean of the Parker College in 2025.

Over the course of his career, Amason served as president of the Southern Management Association, a regional affiliate of the Academy of Management (2008–2009), on the board of governors of the Southern Management Association (2000–2002), as founder and interim director of the Terry College Music Business Program (2003–2006), and director of undergraduate advancement in the Institute for Leadership Advancement, Terry College of Business (2001 – 2003). He is also a Fellow of the Southern Management Association.

Amason currently serves on the Initial Accreditation Committee (IAC) and was formerly on the Continuous Improvement Review Committee (CIRC) of the AACSB. Internationally, he led the initial accreditation reviews of IBS/RANEPA, Moscow, a leading business school in the Russian Federation and Al Ain University, a leading business school in the United Arab Emirates. He also served as an accreditation mentor to the Graduate School of Economics and Management, Ural Federal University and the International Management Institute (MIM-Kyiv), in Ukraine.

=== Consulting ===
Over the course of his career, Amason built a strong reputation as a consultant, focused on strategic management and decision-making. His practice ranged from single-episode, problem-solving engagements, to long-term programs involving strategy, organizational development and implementation, as well C-level executive coaching. His client list a variety of well-known organizations, including Advanced Micro Devices (AMD), Computer Associates (CA – Latin America), Davis Transportation, Exide Technologies, Johnson & Johnson (China), Nortel, Novartis, Park Evaluations, Primewest Energy, Rosetta Marketing, Schneider Electric, Tenet Healthcare, and the University of Georgia Athletic Association. Additionally, Amason has held the following positions:

- Board of directors: Russian Foundation for Human Reproductive Health, Maintenance & Recovery. Moscow, Russian Federation. (2008 – 2022)
- Board of directors: The Ocean Exchange, Savannah Georgia. (2014 – 2018)
- Board of advisors: Georgia Oak Partners, Atlanta GA. (2009 – 2013)
- Strategic partner and consultant: Lore International, Durango, Colorado. (2003 – 2010)

=== Publications ===
As a researcher and author, Amason has written nearly 50 academic journal articles, chapters, and books. His book Strategic Management: From Theory to Practice was first published in 2011 by Routledge. The second edition, co-authored by Andrew Ward, and published in 2021 by Routledge. Both editions were met with acclaim and commercial success. Professor of Management & Entrepreneurship at Florida Atlantic University Gary Castrogiovanni, said, “This may be the best strategic management textbook that I have seen in recent years.” Additionally, Philip Bromiley of University of California, Irvine, said, "Amason and Ward’s book provides a solid presentation of tools and insights necessary for a fine strategy text. It also nicely balances analytics of strategy and the management of strategy."

As noted previous, Amason has been listed in Stanford University’s Science-Wide Author Databases of Standardized Citation Indicators, which lists the top 2% of scientists and researchers, worldwide, by discipline and citation counts.

In addition to his work as professor, dean, researcher, and consultant, Amason is also the author of Expensive Yanna: An Adoption Story, which was published in 2015. The memoir tells the story of Amason and his late wife Cricket’s 16-month journey that culminated in the adoption of their fourth child.

=== Selected publications ===
- Amason, Allen C. (1996-02-01). "Distinguishing the Effects of Functional and Dysfunctional Conflict on Strategic Decision Making: Resolving a Paradox for Top Management Teams". Academy of Management Journal. 39 (1): 123–148. doi:10.5465/256633. ISSN 0001-4273.
- Amason, Allen C.; Sapienza, Harry J. (August 1997). "The Effects of Top Management Team Size and interaction Norms on Cognitive and Affective Conflict". Journal of Management. 23 (4): 495–516. doi:10.1177/014920639702300401. ISSN 0149-2063. S2CID 143833786.
- Ensley, Michael D; Pearson, Allison W; Amason, Allen C (2002-07-01). "Understanding the dynamics of new venture top management teams: cohesion, conflict, and new venture performance". Journal of Business Venturing. 17 (4): 365–386. doi:10.1016/S0883-9026(00)00065-3. ISSN 0883-9026.
- Amason, Allen C.; Shrader, Rodney C.; Tompson, George H. (2006-01-01). "Newness and novelty: Relating top management team composition to new venture performance". Journal of Business Venturing. 21 (1): 125–148. doi:10.1016/j.jbusvent.2005.04.008. ISSN 0883-9026.
- Amason, Allen C.; Schweiger, David M. (1994-01-01). "Resolving the Paradox of Conflict, Strategic Decision Making, and Organizational Performance". International Journal of Conflict Management. 5 (3): 239–253. doi:10.1108/eb022745. ISSN 1044-4068.
- Amason, Allen C.; Thompson, Kenneth R.; Hochwarter, Wayne A.; Harrison, Allison W. (1995-09-01). "Conflict: An important dimension in successful management teams". Organizational Dynamics. 24 (2): 20–35. doi:10.1016/0090-2616(95)90069-1. ISSN 0090-2616.
