= Richard E. Sorensen =

American academic administrator (1942-2020)

- Born: December 28, 1942; United States
- Died: December 29, 2020 (aged 78); Florida
- Occupation: Academic administrator
- Known for: Dean of both the Pamplin College of Business at Virginia Tech

Richard E. Sorensen was an American academic administrator who was the former dean of both the Pamplin College of Business at Virginia Tech and Appalachian State University’s business school. He had been a dean for over 40 years before his retirement. He was also a professor emeritus at Virginia Tech.

== Early years and education ==
He graduated from Brooklyn Polytechnic Institute with a BS, and did his MBA and PhD at NYU Stern.

== Recognition and legacy ==
Several faculty fellowships and chair endowments are named after him. He was formally honored in the Virginia State Capitol by the Virginia General Assembly. In 2015 AACSB International had appointed him as special advisor.
