= Robert Preston Brooks =

American historian, educator (1881–1961)

Robert Preston Brooks (July 23, 1881 in Milledgeville, Georgia – October 28, 1961 in Athens, Georgia) was one of the first recipients of the Rhodes Scholarship, and later served as the first dean of the School of Commerce (renamed the Terry College of Business in 1991) at the University of Georgia from 1920 to 1945. Brooks authored numerous books and papers about Georgia, with emphasis on history and commerce.

== Personal life ==
Brooks graduated from the Georgia Military College at Milledgeville, Georgia in 1899. Robert immediately got a job in Cartersville, Georgia as a secretary to John W. Akin (President of the Iron Belt Railroad and Mining Company, the Cherokee Ochre and Barites Company and the Southern Plaster Company). Robert did all of his letter writing and kept books of the several corporations that John Akin managed, all for a salary of forty dollars per month. After six months in Cartersville, Robert worked for two years in Valdosta, Georgia for the Valdosta Foundry and Machine Company. Later, Brooks received a doctorate degree from the University of Wisconsin–Madison. In 1904, Brooks became one of the first recipients of the Rhodes Scholarship and was the first Rhodes Scholarship pupil sent from Georgia to the University of Oxford.

Brooks married Josephine Reid in 1908 and they had three daughters; Josephine Reid Brooks (1909), Eugenia Preston Brooks (1916), Anne Moore Brooks (1919). In 1910, Robert and Josephine Brooks were living in Athens, Clarke County, Georgia. Robert Preston Brooks died in Athens, Georgia, on October 28, 1961, and was buried in the Oconee Hill Cemetery in Athens.

== University of Georgia ==
Brooks was the dean of the School of Commerce at the University of Georgia from 1920 to 1945. Before that, he was professor of history. The Business Administration Building was renamed "Robert Preston Brooks Hall." In 1957, he authored the book Under Seven Flags. At the time of his death, he was a Dean Emeritus of the University of Georgia.

== Writings ==
- The Agrarian Revolution in Georgia, 1865-1912 (1914)
- History of Georgia (1913)
- The Financial History of Georgia (1952)
- Under Seven Flags (1957)
- Georgia Studies (1969)
