= Virginia Tech Pamplin College of Business =

Business school of Virginia Tech

R.B. Pamplin College of Business
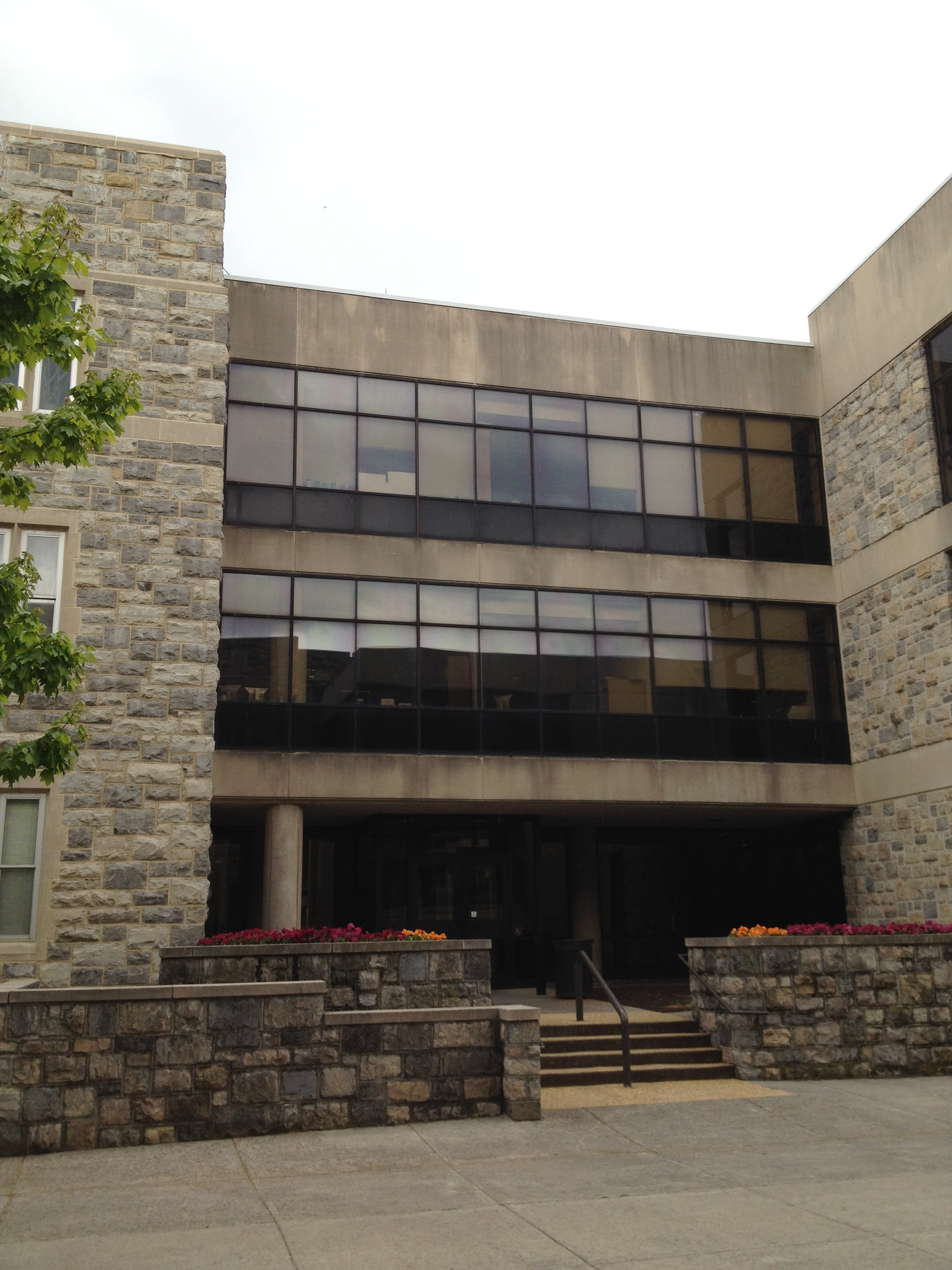
- Pamplin Hall on the main campus where undergraduate, graduate, and doctoral students typically have classes
- Type: Public business school
- Established: 1965
- Parent institution: Virginia Tech
- Endowment: ▲$1.04 billion (parent institution)
- Dean: Saonee Sarker
- Undergraduates: 3,845
- Postgraduates: 389
- Location: Arlington; Blacksburg; Falls Church; Richmond; Roanoke, Virginia, US
- Website: www.pamplin.vt.edu

The R.B. Pamplin College of Business (commonly known as Pamplin College of Business or Pamplin), is Virginia Tech's business school. Founded in 1965, it has more than 41,000 alumni. The current dean is Saonee Sarker. In 1986 the college was renamed following a donation from alumnus Robert B. Pamplin and his son Robert B. Pamplin Jr.

The college offers three different kinds of Master of Business Administration (MBA) degrees, three different Master of Science in Business Administration (MSBA) degrees, and a Master of Accounting and Information Systems (MACIS) degree. In addition, Pamplin offers two PhD degrees, non-degree executive development programs, and majors and minors for undergraduate students. Pamplin jointly offers a Master of Information Technology (MIT) degree with the Virginia Tech College of Engineering. The most recent national U.S. News & World Report rank shows Pamplin's undergraduate program is 23rd among public institutions and the Evening MBA Program is ranked 16th overall.

== History ==
- 1925 First bachelor's degree in business offered
- 1931 First master's degree in business offered
- 1961 School of Business is established
- 1965 The school became an official college of Virginia Tech
- 1966 College of Business accredited by American Association of Collegiate Schools of Business (AACSB)
- 1969 Master of Accountancy program is established
- 1983 Evening MBA program is established
- 1986 College of Business receives a donation and is renamed after Robert B. Pamplin and his son
- 1996 Executive MBA program is established
- 2007 Diversity Center is established
- 2013 Apex Systems Center for Innovation and Entrepreneurship is established
- 2014 Center for Business Intelligence and Analytics is established
- 2015 Pamplin celebrates 50th Anniversary as a college

== Academics ==
Pamplin offers undergraduate, graduate, and doctoral programs on Virginia Tech's Blacksburg campus. At the graduate level, the college offers MBA programs in Northern Virginia, Richmond, and Roanoke.

=== Undergraduate Study ===
The undergraduate program offers majors in accounting, business information technology, economics, finance, hospitality, information systems, management, marketing, real estate, and tourism management. Minors are offered in: Applied Business Computing, Business Diversity, Entrepreneurship, International Business, Leadership, Multicultural Diversity Management, and Professional Sales.

=== Learning Accelerator for Undergraduates ===
In 2022, the university announced the creation of a learning center to “provide a dedicated space for Pamplin undergraduates to receive and deliver academic coaching services.” The center, funded by a grant from Tech alumnus, Omar Asali, is expected to be completed by 2025.

=== Study Abroad ===
Pamplin offers study-abroad opportunities for both graduate and undergraduate students. Pamplin students can attend Virginia Tech's Center for European Studies and Architecture in Riva San Vitale, Switzerland, and other European universities offer opportunities as well.

=== Rankings ===
U.S. News & World Report rankings
- Master of Information Technology: 2
- Evening Master of Business Administration: 7
- Public Undergraduate Program: 23
- Overall Undergraduate Program: 39

The College’s part-time MBA program is ranked #35 by the 2024 U.S. News & World Report.

=== Departments ===
Pamplin has several academic departments/schools:

- Accounting and Information Systems
- Business Information Technology
- Economics
- Finance, Insurance, and Business Law
- Hospitality and Tourism Management
- Management
- Marketing
- The Program in Real Estate

==== Academic centers ====
Pamplin has a number of "academic centers".

- Apex Systems Center for Innovation and Entrepreneurship
- Center for Business Intelligence and Analytics
- Center for Leadership Studies
- Business Diversity Center
- Business Leadership Center

== Career placement ==
Pamplin maintains a high job placement for its graduates. According to PayScale's 2015–2016 report, Pamplin's MBA graduates have an average mid career salary of $125,000.

== Programs offered ==
The range of programs offered by Pamplin includes:

=== Doctorate programs ===
- PhD in Business
- PhD in Hospitality and Tourism Management

=== Graduate programs ===
- Evening MBA with concentration in:
  - Corporate and Financial Services Management
  - Global Business
  - Hospitality and Tourism Management
  - Information Systems and Technology
  - Organizational Management
- Executive MBA
- Professional MBA
- MIT in Information Technology
- MSBA in Business analytics
- MSBA in Advanced Marketing Research
- MSBA in Hospitality and Tourism Management
- MACIS in Accounting and Information Systems

=== Undergraduate programs ===
- Majors
  - Accounting and Information Systems
  - Business Information Technology
  - Cybersecurity Management & Analytics
  - Entrepreneurship, Innovation & Technology Management
  - Finance
  - Hospitality and Tourism Management
  - Human Resource Management
  - Management
  - Management Consulting and Analytics
  - Marketing
  - Real Estate
- Minors
  - Applied Business Computing
  - Leadership
  - Entrepreneurship-New Venture Growth
  - International Business
  - Multicultural Diversity Management
  - Professional Sales
  - Business Diversity

== Campus locations ==
- Pamplin offers undergraduate majors/minors, graduate programs, and doctoral programs on the Blacksburg campus at Pamplin Hall and Wallace Hall
- Pamplin offers graduate and professional programs in the Washington metropolitan area, Richmond metropolitan area, and Roanoke metropolitan area.

=== Metro for students in Washington metropolitan area ===
Graduate and Professional programs are located near Washington National Airport and Dulles International Airport which are located within the Washington metropolitan area. These programs are served by off-campus stops on the Washington DC Metro.

== Leadership ==
The following is a list of deans of the college:

Dean	Tenure
Herbert H. Mitchell	1965–1982
Richard E. Sorensen	1982–2013
Robert T. Sumichrast	2013–2022
Saonee Sarker	2023–present

== Clubs and organizations ==
Some of the most popular clubs are the Accounting Society, BASIS (Bond And Securities Investing by Students), PRISM, Beta Alpha Psi, Business Technology Club, Business Horizons, Delta Sigma Pi, Hospitality Management Association, Virginia Tech Management Society, National Association of Black Accountants, Pi Sigma Epsilon, Society for Human Resource Management, Student-Managed Endowment for Educational Development, and the American Marketing Association:

== Alumni relations ==
The Pamplin College of Business Alumni Association is an alumni organization for former students of the college. In total 24,185 alumni live in Virginia, and 41,738 reside Domestically and Internationally.

The Pamplin Advisory Council was founded in 1969 and was chartered to offer ideas and guidance to the dean of the college. In addition, the council assists with connecting the college with the business community. Currently there are over 70 member on the council.

The college publishes a business magazine, Virginia Tech Business Magazine.

== Notable alumni ==
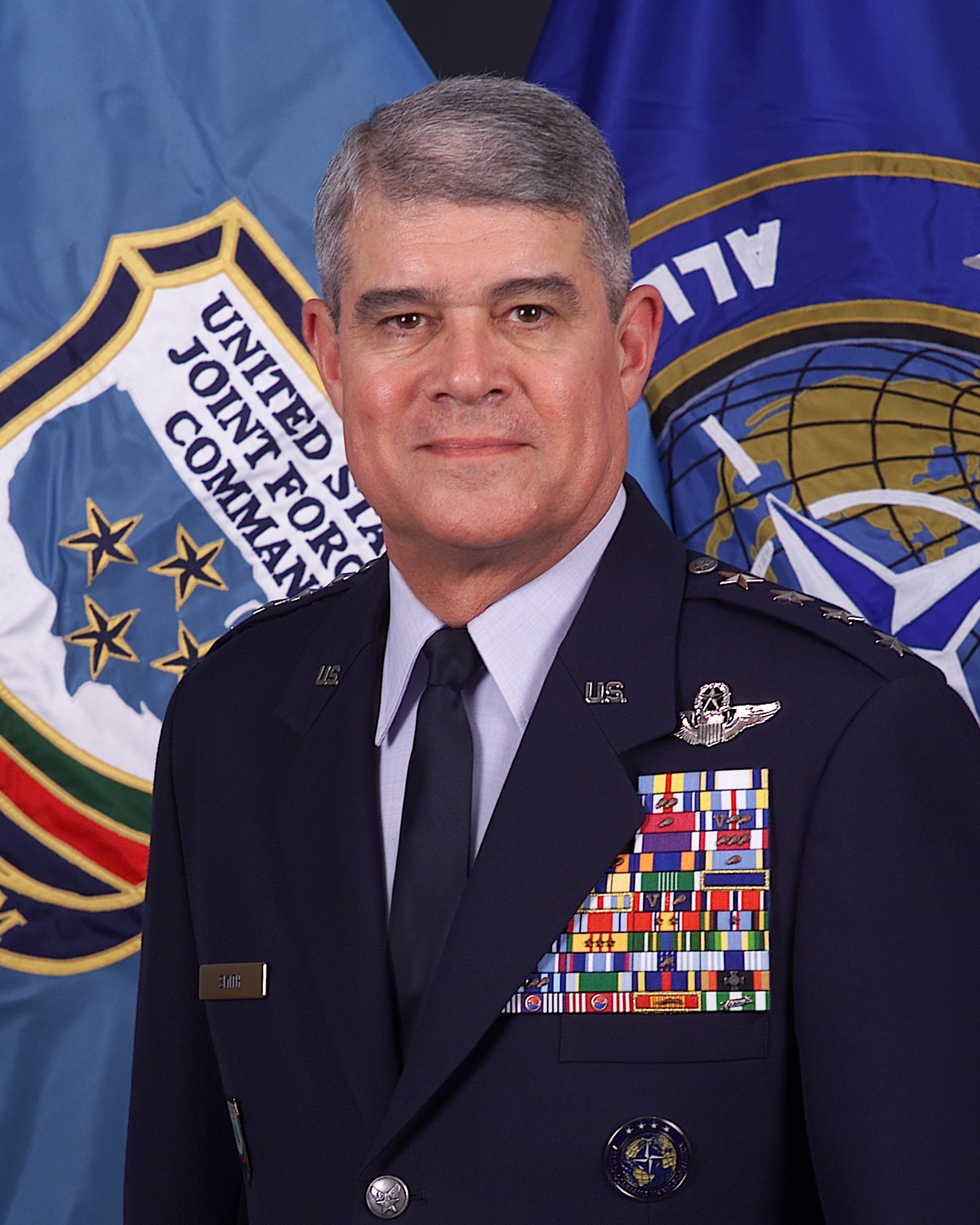
General Lance Smith

- Robert B. Pamplin (business administration 1933) was the president and chairman of the board of Georgia-Pacific and the founder of R.B. Pamplin Corporation in Portland, Oregon.
- Thomas C. Richards (general business 1956) is a former General in the United States Air Force and the former chief of staff of the Supreme Headquarters Allied Powers Europe.
- Lance L. Smith (business administration 1969) is a former General in the United States Air Force who served as the commander, U.S. Joint Forces Command, Norfolk, Virginia, and NATO Supreme Allied Commander for Transformation from November 10, 2005, to November 9, 2007.
- Dave Calhoun (accounting 1979) is the chief executive officer of Boeing.
- Wayne Robinson (finance 1980) is a retired American basketball player.
- Robert B. Pamplin, Jr. is the chairman, president, and CEO of the R.B. Pamplin Corporation. The Pamplin College of Business at Virginia Tech and the Pamplin School of Business at the University of Portland are named in his honor.

== See also ==
- List of United States business school rankings
- List of business schools in the United States
- Virginia Polytechnic Institute and State University
- Virginia Tech College of Engineering
- Business School
