= Virginia Tech College of Engineering =

Academic unit of Virginia Tech

- Motto: Ut Prosim (Latin)
- Motto in English: That I May Serve
- Type: Public engineering school
- Established: 1903
- Affiliations: Virginia Tech
- Dean: Julia Ross
- Faculty: 407
- Students: 10,059
- Undergraduates: 7,802
- Postgraduates: 2,257
- Location: Arlington; Blacksburg; Falls Church; Hampton Roads; Leesburg; Richmond; Roanoke, Virginia, U.S.
- Total Alumni: Nearly 60,000
- Colors: Chicago maroon and Burnt orange
- Website: www.eng.vt.edu

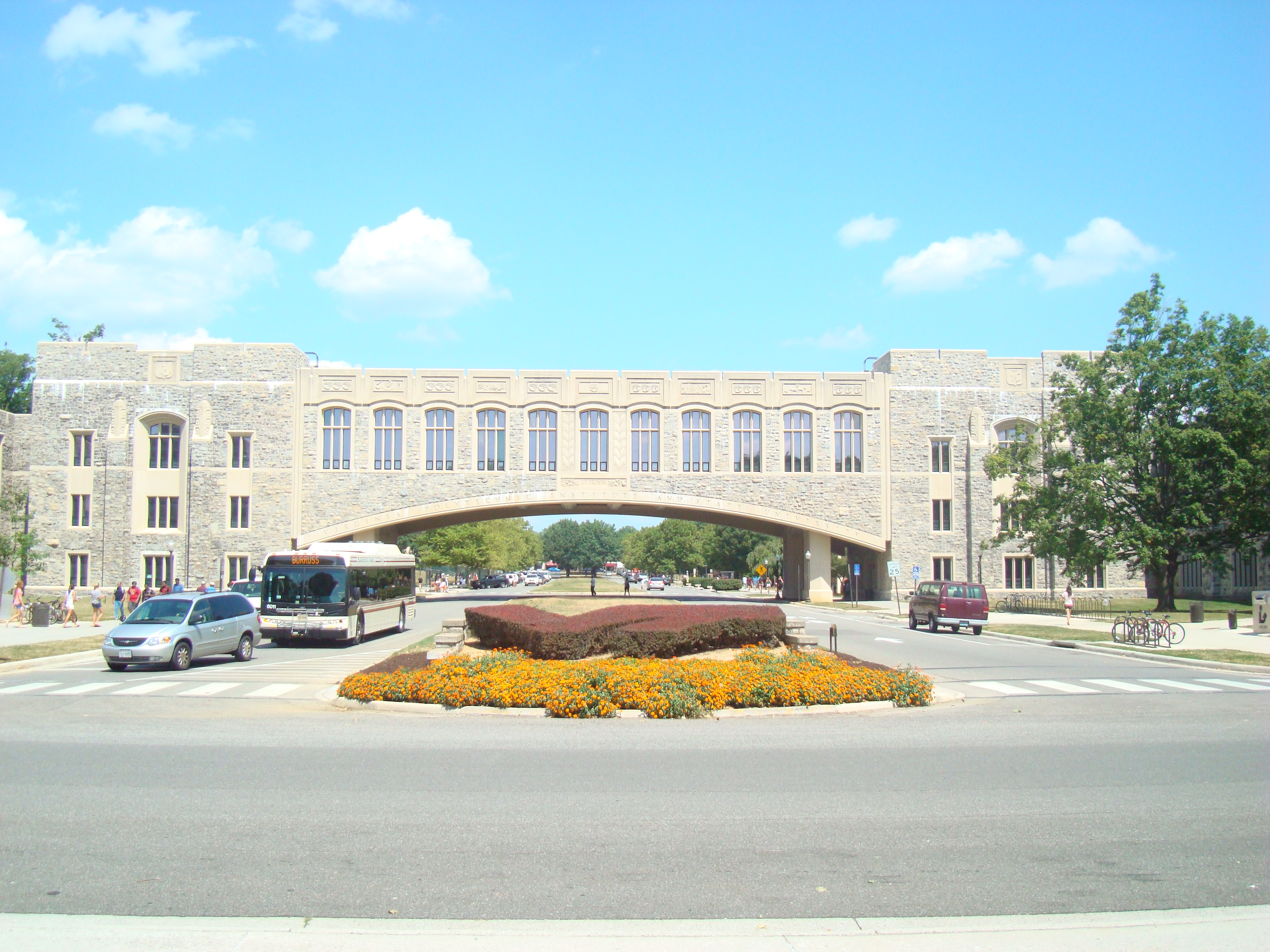
Torgersen Hall hosts many of Virginia Tech's engineering resources

The Virginia Tech College of Engineering is the academic unit that manages engineering research and education at Virginia Tech. The College can trace its origins to 1872, and was formally established in 1903. Today, The College of Engineering is the largest academic unit of Virginia Tech and has 14 departments of study. Its undergraduate program was ranked 4th and its graduate program was ranked 30th among doctoral-granting universities by U.S. News & World Report in 2018. In 2014–15, the College of Engineering consisted of 10,059 students. The current dean is Julia Ross.

== History ==
Engineering courses have been available since the inception of Virginia Tech in 1872 when a student could follow the "Mechanical" course of study which included mechanical drawing, mechanical engineering, machinery, and steam engines. When the first administrative instructional divisions were established in 1903–04, engineering was one of four academic departments for which a dean was appointed. In 1920–21, it became the School of Engineering and then, in 1964, the College of Engineering.

== Departments ==
- Aerospace and Ocean Engineering
- Biological Systems Engineering
- Biomedical Engineering and Mechanics
- Chemical Engineering
- Civil and Environmental Engineering
- Computer Science
- Electrical and Computer Engineering
- Engineering Education
- Industrial and Systems Engineering
- Materials Science and Engineering
- Mechanical Engineering
- Mining and Minerals Engineering
- Myers-Lawson School of Construction
- School of Biomedical Engineering & Sciences

== Undergraduate programs ==
The Department of Engineering Education is home to all first-year and transfer engineering students.

U.S. News & World Report Undergrad Engineering Ranking
- Undergraduate Public: 7
- Undergraduate Overall: 13
- Environmental Engineering: 7
- Industrial/Manufacturing Engineering: 4
- Civil Engineering: 9
- Biological/Agricultural Engineering: 8

=== Rankings ===
Virginia Tech has an undergraduate engineering school. Listed below are rankings by the U.S. News & World Report for undergraduate programs:

- The overall Undergraduate Program ranks No. 13 overall and No. 7 among the public institutions according to U.S. News & World Report.
- Undergraduate Industrial/Manufacturing Engineering programs ranked No. 4 overall.
- Undergraduate Environmental Engineering programs ranked No. 7 overall.

== Graduate programs ==
U.S. News & World Report Graduate Engineering Ranking
- Graduate Public: 11
- Graduate Overall: 21
- Biological / Agricultural Engineering: 7
- Industrial / Manufacturing / Systems Engineering: 7
- Civil Engineering: 9
- Environmental / Environmental Health Engineering: 10
- Online Graduate Engineering Program: 15
- Master in Information Technology: 2

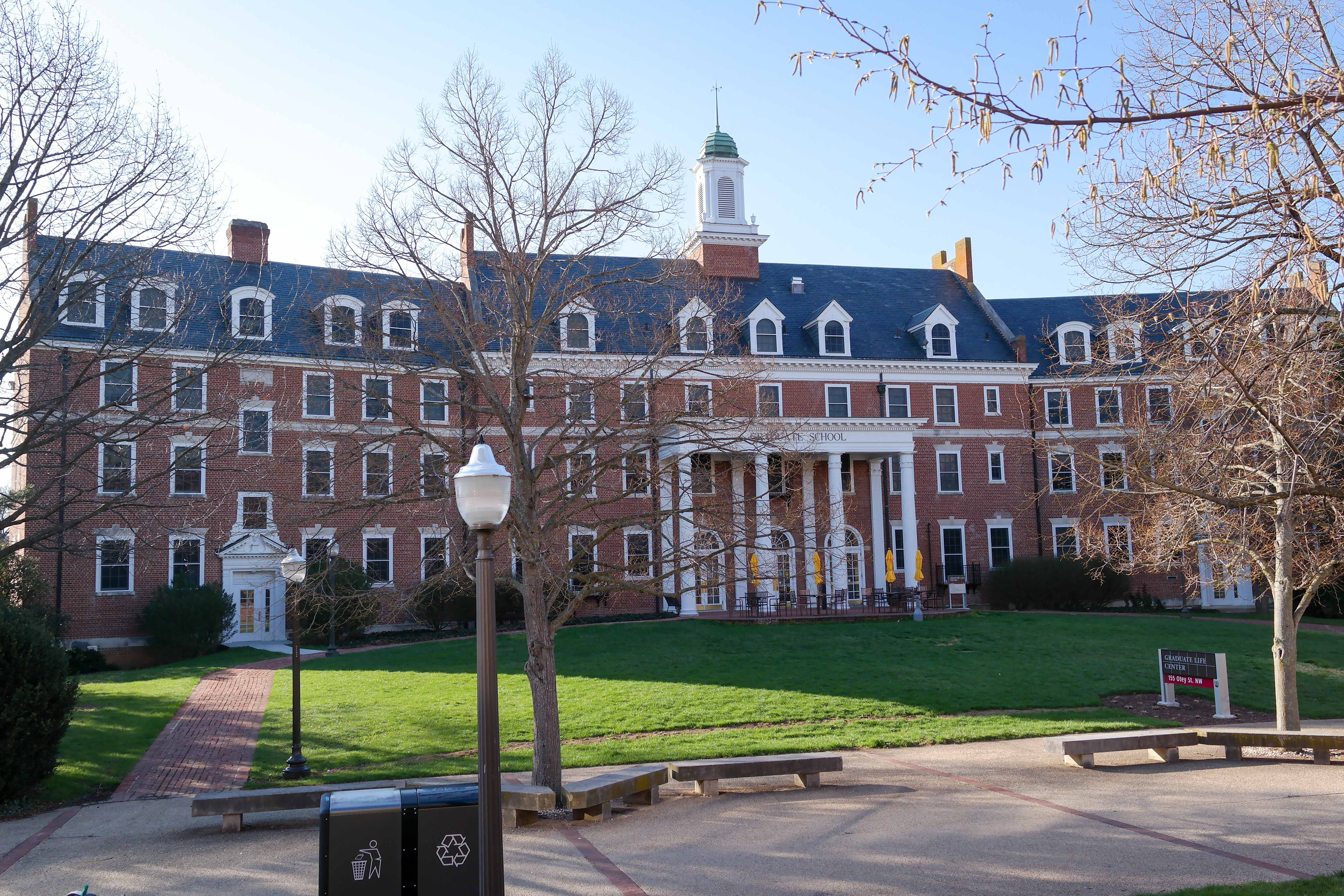
The Graduate Life Center at Virginia Tech in Blacksburg, Virginia.

Virginia Tech College of Engineering Graduate Students may choose from 16 Doctoral and 19 Masters programs available in 17 areas of study.

=== Rankings ===
Virginia Tech has a Graduate Engineering Programs. Listed below are rankings by the U.S. News & World Report for the graduate programs:

- The Graduate program ranks No. 21 overall and No. 11 among the public institutions according to U.S. News & World Report.
- The Graduate Biological / Agricultural Engineering programs ranked No. 7 overall.
- The Graduate Industrial / Manufacturing / Systems Engineering programs ranked No. 7 overall.
- The Graduate Civil Engineering programs ranked No. 9 overall.
- The Online Graduate Engineering Programs ranked No. 15 overall.
- The Graduate Computer Engineering Program ranked No. 17 overall.

=== Master of Information Technology Program ===
The Graduate Program in Information Technology (VT-MIT) is a combined degree program offered collaboratively by Virginia Tech's College of Engineering, and the Pamplin College of Business. Virginia Tech's Master of Information Technology program was created in 2000 to meet needs of students. The program puts the student in touch with the latest developments in information technology, and the student body is highly accomplished and diverse. The program provides courses that are interdisciplinary, online, and currently has over 420 students enrolled in the United States and several other countries. The College of Engineering and the Pamplin College of Business jointly deliver the master of information technology program, which is accredited by the Southern Association of Colleges and Schools.

Courses in the program are taught by a group of senior level faculty using a technology where students from several states in the United States, along with those from many foreign nations participate online in this program. In 2014 the U.S. News & World Report ranked this program 2nd overall. 30 credits hours of coursework are required for the degree. Each student selects must complete three modules, for a total of 18 credit-hours, as well at the 12 credit-hour block of foundation courses in Java, Software Engineering, Computer Systems fundamentals, and Strategic IT Leadership. Admission requirements include a bachelor's degree or its equivalent from an accredited institution, essays, letters of recommendation, a GMAT or GRE score and a TOEFL or PTE score for international applicants.

==== MIT/MBA Dual Degree ====
In addition to the Master in Information Technology (M.I.T.) degree, Virginia Tech offers a joint M.I.T./M.B.A. program for students within the Virginia Tech National Capital Region. Students are able to pursue this dual degree in information technology and business administration via a sequential degree offering. The dual degree allows for the student to save time and requires 66 credit hours/22 courses for both degrees.

== Additional Locations & Online Options ==
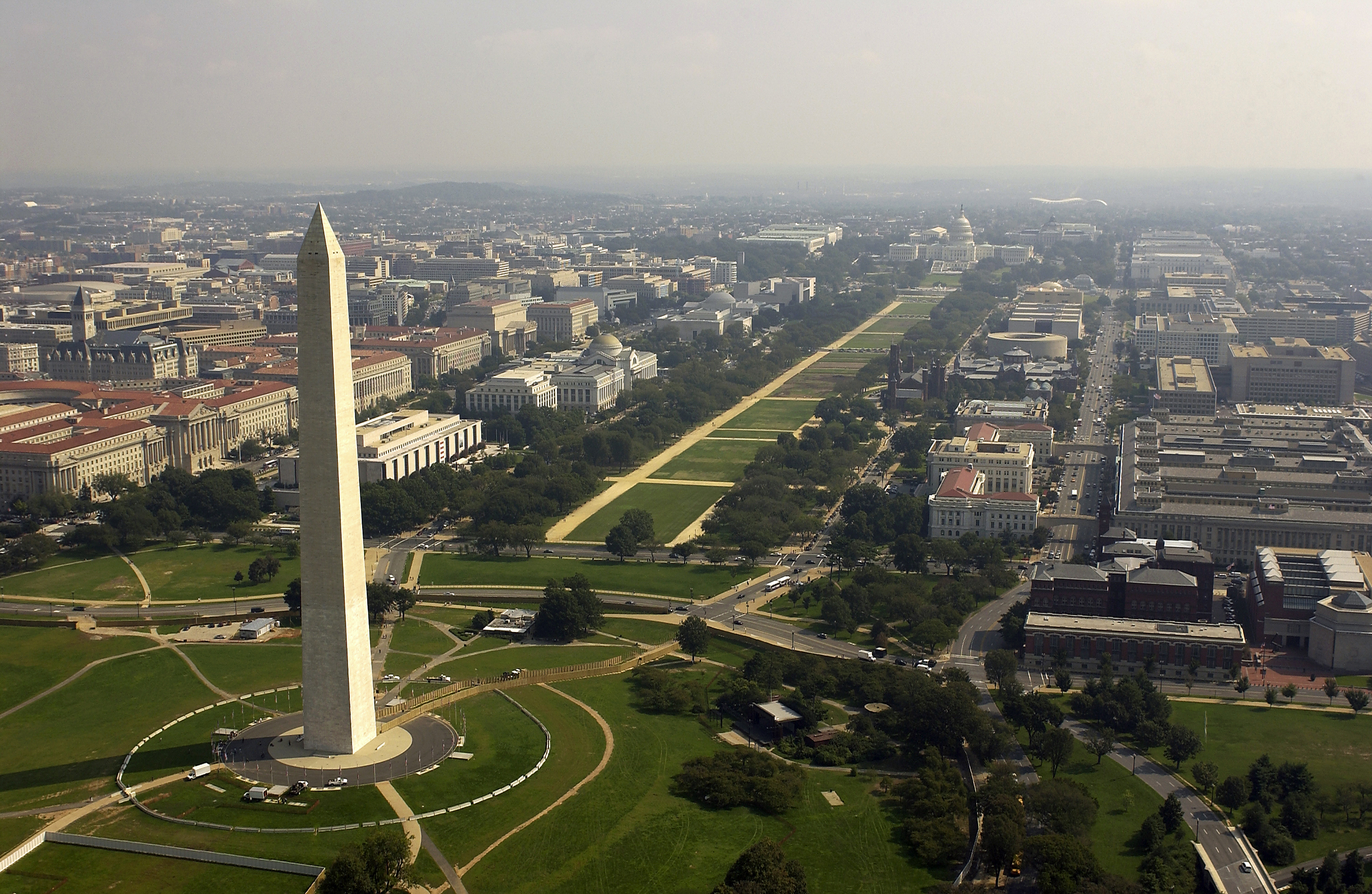
Virginia Tech's National Capital Region offers engineering programs within the Washington metropolitan area.

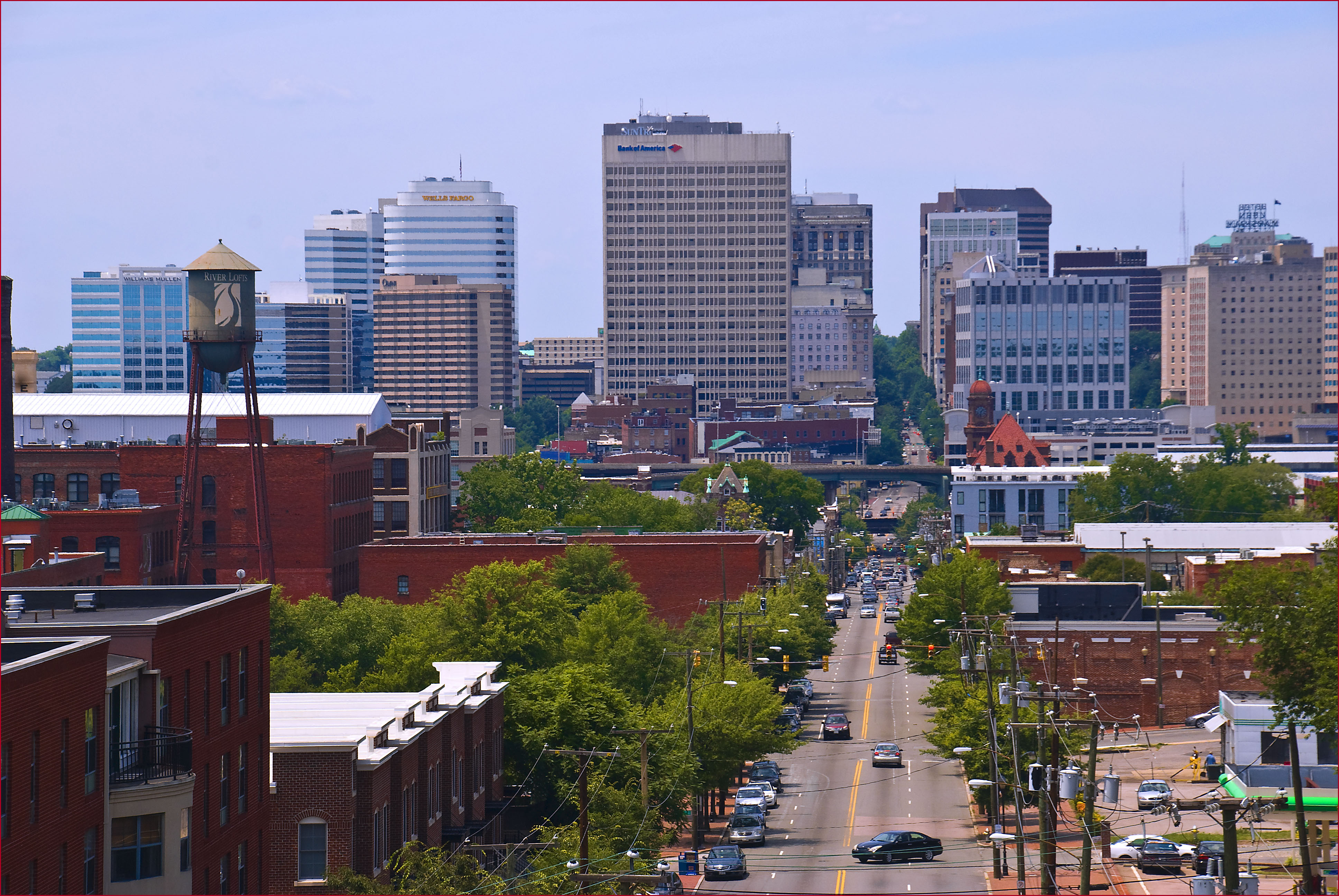
The College of Engineering offers engineering programs within the Greater Richmond Region.

=== National Capital Region ===
In 1969 the university launched new locations within the Virginia Tech National Capital Region (NCR). These facilities serves as a hub in the Washington metropolitan area for its students and alumni. As of 2015, the NCR offers Graduate Engineering Programs in Computer Engineering, Civil Engineering, Computer Science & Applications, Electrical Engineering, Environmental Engineering, Environmental Sciences & Engineering, Industrial & Systems Engineering, and Mechanical Engineering.

=== Innovation Campus ===
In 2018, Virginia Tech unveiled its plans to construct a new 1 million square foot campus in the Northern Virginia area. The news came with the announcement of Amazon's plans to construct their National Landing HQ2 in the Pentagon City and Crystal City areas of Arlington County, with Virginia Tech's new campus being a key factor in attracting them. The new Campus is a jointly funded effort between the state and the University and its corporate donors, with an estimated cost of 1 billion dollars. It will have a focus on creating a pipeline for students in graduate degree programs related to computer technology. Virginia Tech, along with other state schools, has been tasked with increasing its pool of technology graduates. It must graduate approximately 10 thousand graduates and 6 thousand undergraduates in Computer related degrees by 2040 to receive its full state endowment. As of Fall 2019, Virginia Tech has opened applications for its first cohort in the Master of Engineering in Computer Science to begin in spring 2020. Future plans are to house other computer-related graduate degrees, such as the M.A. in Data Analysis, the M.Eng. Electrical and Computer Engineering, and the M.I.T. programs, at the Innovation Campus at Potomac Yards, Alexandria as the building continues and the campus expands.

=== Hampton Roads ===
As of 2015, the Hampton Roads location offers Graduate Engineering Programs in Computer Engineering, Civil Engineering, Electrical Engineering, Industrial & Systems Engineering, and Mechanical Engineering.

=== Southwest Virginia & Richmond ===
As of 2015, the Southwest Virginia and Richmond Locations offers Graduate Engineering Programs in Computer Engineering, Civil Engineering, Electrical Engineering, and Industrial & Systems Engineering.

=== Online engineering degree options ===
As of 2015, the College of Engineering started to offer online Graduate Engineering Programs in Aerospace Engineering, Computer Engineering, Electrical Engineering, Environmental Sciences & Engineering, Information Technology, and Ocean Engineering.

== Research ==
Virginia Tech's College of Engineering is classified as a "Research University (very high research activity)," by the Carnegie Foundation and is engaged in some of the most important engineering research and cross-disciplinary research conducted in the nation. By The Numbers for the college:

- $214,485,000 was spent on engineering research in FY2013.
- 43% of all research spending at Virginia Tech is engineering related.

=== Centers, Institutes, and Laboratories ===
Listed are the Centers and Laboratories associated with the College of Engineering:

- The Advanced Research in Information Assurance and Security
- Advanced Vehicle Dynamics Laboratory
- Baker Environmental Hydraulics Laboratory
- Center of Advanced Separation Technology
- Center for Automotive Fuel Cell Systems
- Center for Bridge Engineering
- Center for e-Design
- Center for Embedded Systems for Critical Applications
- Center for Energy and the Global Environment
- Center for Energy Harvesting Materials and Systems
- Center for Energy Systems Research
- NEXTOR Center for Excellence in Aviation Operations Research
- Center for Geospatial Information Technology
- Center for Geotechnical Practice and Research
- Center for High End Computing Systems
- Center for High Performance Manufacturing
- Center for Human Computer Interaction
- Center for Injury Biomechanics

- Center for Innovation in Construction Safety and Health
- Center for Intelligent Material Systems and Structures
- Center for Naval Systems
- Center for Photonics Technology
- Center for Power Electronics Systems
- Center for Power and Energy
- Center for Space Science and Engineering Research
- Center for Tire Research
- Center for Total Maximum Daily Load and Watershed Studies
- Center for Turbomachinery & Propulsion Research
- Center for Vehicle Systems and Safety
- Commonwealth Center for Aerospace & Propulsion Systems
- EXTREME Lab
- Hume Center for National Security and Technology
- Innovative Particulate Materials Laboratory
- Institute for Critical Technology and Applied Science
- Lab for Advanced Scientific Computing and Applications
- Macromolecules and Interfaces Institute

- Multidisciplinary Analysis and Design Center for Advanced Vehicles
- Multifunctional Integrated Circuits and Systems Group
- National Institute of Aerospace
- Occupational Safety and Health Research Center
- Performance Engineering Research Lab
- Renewable Materials Research Group
- Rotor Dynamics Laboratory
- Software Technologies Laboratory
- SyNeRGY Lab
- Technology, Open Organizing and Learning Sciences Lab
- Vibrations and Acoustics Laboratories
- VIPER Services Steve Southward
- Virginia Active Combustion Control Group
- Virginia Center for Autonomous Systems
- Virginia Tech Advanced Research Institute
- Virginia Center for Coal and Energy Research
- Virginia Tech Center for Engineering Communications
- Virginia Tech Transportation Institute
- Wireless @ Virginia Tech

== Alumni association ==
The Virginia Tech College of Engineering Alumni Association is an alumni organization for former students of the college. Students have numerous opportunities to meet corporate executives and to network with the college's alumni base, many of whom are renowned engineering leaders. In addition the college has nearly 60,000 alumni.

== See also ==
- Virginia Polytechnic Institute and State University
- List of engineering schools in the United States
- Virginia Tech's Main Campus in Blacksburg
