= Robert Sumichrast =

- Born: April 24th
- Education: Purdue University (B.S.), Clemson University (Ph.D.)
- Occupation: Former Dean of Virginia Tech Pamplin College of Business

Retired Dean, Pamplin College of Business
- In office July 1, 2013 – June 30, 2022
- Preceded by: Richard E. Sorensen
- Website: University Directory

Robert T. Sumichrast is the former dean of the Pamplin College of Business at Virginia Tech.

== Academic career ==
=== Virginia Tech ===
Sumichrast began his career as an assistant professor of management science at Virginia Tech in 1984. After 6 years, he rose to associate professor, and then a professor of management science and information technology in 1996. Sumichrast was named the associate dean of graduate and international programs at Virginia Tech's Pamplin College of Business in 1998.

=== Louisiana State University ===
After nearly twenty years at Virginia Tech, Sumichrast left to become the dean of the E.J. Ourso College of Business at Louisiana State University in 2003. During this time Sumichrast expanded their international programs and increased development efforts.

=== University of Georgia ===
In 2007, Sumichrast became the dean of the Terry College of Business at the University of Georgia. During this time Dr. Sumichrast increased research programs, expanded alumni relations, and led efforts to fund a new classroom building and meeting space. In 2008, Sumichrast presented alongside Steve Forbes at the Georgia Economic Outlook luncheon, warning of three recession triggers. In 2011, Sumichrast was appointed to the board of directors of the Association to Advance Collegiate Schools of Business

=== Virginia Tech ===
In 2013, Sumichrast returned to Virginia Tech to serve as Dean for the Pamplin College of Business.

Since coming to Virginia Tech, Sumichrast implemented the Innovate Entrepreneurial Living Community, established the Center for Innovation and Entrepreneurship, increased the amount of furniture available in public spaces around Pamplin Hall, and managed the college's response to controversies surrounding the Finance Department's BB&T Distinguished Lecture Series. Sumichrast also chaired the Doctoral Education Task Force of the Association to Advance Collegiate Schools of Business, which published “The Promise of Doctoral Education” in 2013.

In the strategic plans for 2014–2019, Sumichrast laid out the framework for the construction of Pamplin College's Business Learning Community. The GBAC will grow the college's footprint on campus, while establishing collaborative spaces, growing the three college centers, and developing a residential community. In 2016, Virginia Tech announced plans for the construction of a new Global Business and Data Analytics Complex.

The Distinguished Lecture Series, established in 2007 with a $1 million gift from BB&T Charitable Foundation, features an invited speaker each semester discussing the foundations of capitalism and freedom. Announcement of the March 2016 speaker, Charles Murray, sparked campus protests. Sumichrast decided not to disinvite Murray or cancel the lecture. Addressing protestors' concerns, he transferred responsibility for speaker invitations from finance professor and program director Douglas Patterson to a newly formed committee, hosted a two-hour Teach In with students and faculty members, and arranged for a publicly funded counter-lecture.

In May 2016, Sumichrast's statements concerning an alleged speaking invitation and disinvitation to Manhattan Institute senior fellow and Wall Street Journal columnist Jason Riley garnered controversy. Following clarifying statements from the lecture series committee - its selected speaker for the fall lecture was Harvard economics professor Robert Barro - Sumichrast and Virginia Tech President Tim Sands apologized for the misunderstanding and invited Riley to speak at the university at a future date.
