= Bryan Calhoun =

Music executive

Bryan Calhoun is vice president of New Media and External Affairs at SoundExchange.

A speaker and panelist at industry events, he holds a position on the boards of Future of Music Coalition, and the University of Georgia Music Business Program.

Calhoun teaches a Fundamentals of Music Business course at Clark Atlanta University.
