= The Millionaire Mind =

2000 non-fiction work by Thomas J. Stanley

- Author: Thomas J. Stanley
- Language: English
- Genre: Finance Book
- Published: 2000 April 1, 2000 Andrews McMeel Publishing, LLC
- Publication place: United States
- Media type: Hardback
- Pages: 416
- ISBN: 978-0-7407-1858-8
- OCLC: 47920746
- Preceded by: The Millionaire Next Door
- Followed by: Millionaire Women Next Door

The Millionaire Mind is a book by American finance professor Thomas J. Stanley published in 2000.

A follow-up to his earlier The Millionaire Next Door, Stanley draws upon research of North America's affluent to examine the ideas, beliefs and practices of the segment of the financial elite. His findings are contrary to common belief, noting for example that high-wealth Americans typically use little or no consumer credit and tend to avoid conspicuous consumption of high-cost or high-status items. While The Millionaire Next Door focused on those with a net worth of at least US$1 million, The Millionaire Mind emphasizes those with a net worth of at least US$10 million.

The book debuted at #2 on the New York Times Bestseller list on February 18, 2000 and received press and reviews from Fred Barnes, Katie Couric and Donald Trump.

== Summary ==
Following up the bestseller The Millionaire Next Door, The Millionaire Mind analyzes the common environmental and lifestyle factors that preceded and resulted in this researched segment's ability to accumulate wealth.

Stanley's research on how the average American millionaire attained financial success are based on in-depth surveys and interviews with more than 1,300 millionaires. Personal details from this research are shared in the book include memories from their school days, personal thoughts on being "the smart kid in the dumb row," making difficult financial decisions, selecting a vocation and spending habits.

== Reception ==
A review for Bainvestor gave the book a mixed reception, writing that it was an improvement on The Millionaire Next Door due to focusing more on why high-wealth people have certain beliefs or habits and providing a good guide to those interested in accumulating wealth, but the flaws included too much editorializing from Stanley and a lack of emphasis on entrepreneurs, which the reviewer suspected were underrepresented in Stanley's sample.

Tom Butler-Bowdon's review of The Millionaire Mind summarized the book as somewhat repetitive, but wrote: "here are a multitude of revealing facts and ideas besides, including the five 'foundation stones' of financial success most often mentioned by millionaires, enjoyable case histories and anecdotes of specific millionaires."

Trent Hamm of The Simple Dollar wrote that The Millionaire Next Door was probably superior overall for general-audience readers, but that The Millionaire Mind had the advantage of "focus[ing] on what I like to call 'life management' skills more than financial planning, which might be of interest to you if you’re looking for behavioral aspects of how millionaires act."

Jim Lippard, a telecommunications professional and blogger, gave the book a negative review: "This is a deeply flawed book. It purports to be a description of the characteristics and attitudes that make wealthy people wealthy, but it is based mostly on their self-assessments without comparison to a control group. I suspect that this heavily underplays the role of random chance in success, and attributes causation where there is only correlation. Further, the author displays clear biases on a number of topics, which leads him to engage in ad hoc interpretation of his data, sometimes to argue for conclusions that are contrary to the clear implications of the data—such as his arguments for the importance of religion in the lives of millionaires."

Donald Mitchell, author and finance consultant, criticized The Millionaire Mind saying, "because of the way the sample was selected, you won't get much variety...[and that a] control group is essentially missing...."
