= The Millionaire Next Door =

1996 book by Thomas J. Stanley and William D. Danko

- Hardcover edition
- Author: Thomas J. Stanley and William D. Danko
- Language: English
- Genre: Business; Finance
- Publisher: Gallery Books
- Publication date: 1996
- Publication place: United States
- Media type: Print (hardcover)
- Pages: 258
- ISBN: 9780671015206
- Dewey Decimal: 338.0973
- LC Class: HG181 .B836 1969

The Millionaire Next Door: The Surprising Secrets of America's Wealthy (ISBN 0-671-01520-6) is a 1996 book by Thomas J. Stanley and William D. Danko. The book is a compilation of research done by the two authors in the profiles of American millionaires.

The authors compare the behavior of those they call "UAWs" (Under Accumulators of Wealth) and those who are "PAWs" (Prodigious Accumulators of Wealth). They found that millionaires are disproportionately clustered in middle-class and blue-collar neighborhoods and not in more affluent or white-collar communities. This came as a surprise to the authors, who anticipated the contrary. Stanley and Danko's book explains that high-income white-collar professionals are more likely to devote their income to luxury goods or status items, thus neglecting savings and investments.

== UAWs versus PAWs ==
Under Accumulator of Wealth (UAW) is a name coined by the authors and used to represent individuals who have a low net worth relative to their income. The authors offer a rule of thumb (more appropriate for those who are older and thus have been earning longer): “Multiply your age times your realized pre-tax annual household income from all sources except inheritances. Divide by ten. This, less any inherited wealth is what your net worth should be.” Take a 50-year-old doctor earning $250,000. According to the rule of thumb, he should be saving 10% yearly and should have about $1.25 million in net worth. Those whose net worth is lower can be considered "Under Accumulators". UAWs focus on consuming income, rather than saving.

A Prodigious Accumulator of Wealth (PAW) is one who accumulates well over one tenth of the product of their age and their realized pretax income.

Most of the millionaire households the authors researched did not have the extravagant lifestyles that most people would assume. This finding is backed up by surveys indicating how little these millionaire households spent on such things as cars, watches, clothing, and other luxury products or services. Most importantly, the book gives a list of reasons for why these people managed to accumulate so much wealth (the top one being that "They live below their means"). The authors make a distinction between the 'Balance Sheet Affluent' (those with actual wealth, or high-net-worth) and the 'Income Affluent' (those with a high income, but little actual wealth, or low net-worth).

== Main points ==
The authors talked about the seven most common traits that showed up among those that have accumulated wealth. Those common traits are: 1. They live below their means; 2. They allocate time and money efficiently; 3. They value financial independence over displaying high social status; 4. They did not receive regular cash support from their parents. 5. Their adult children are economically self-sufficient; 6. They are good at targeting market opportunities; 7. They chose the right occupation.

=== To increase net worth, spend less than you earn ===
Anyone who spends what they earn or more than they earn will fail to increase their net worth.

=== Avoid buying status objects or leading a status lifestyle ===
Buying or leasing brand-new, expensive imported vehicles is poor value. Buying status objects such as branded consumer goods is a never-ending cycle of depreciating assets. Even when you get a good deal on premium items, if you replace them frequently, the older items hold no value and have become a sunk cost. Living in a status neighborhood is not only poor value, but you will feel the need to keep buying status objects to keep up with your neighbors, who are mostly UAWs. The authors make the point that hyper-consumers must realize more income to afford luxury items and become more vulnerable to inflation and income tax.

=== PAWs are willing to take financial risk if it is worth the reward ===
PAWs are not misers who put every penny under their mattress. They invest their money for good returns, and will consider riskier investments if they are worth the reward. Many put money not only in the stock market, but also in private businesses and venture capital.

=== Family and Generational Wealth ===
The authors observe that UAWs tend to have children who require an influx of their parents' money to afford the lifestyle that they expect for themselves. Their parents are less likely to have taught them about money, budgeting or investing.

== Spending tomorrow's cash today ==
The most prominent idea shared by UAWs and American society in general is "spending tomorrow's cash today". This is the leading cause of debt and a lack of net worth in the UAW category. This contradicts the common belief of a PAW: "save today's cash for tomorrow". Many UAWs do plan, under certain conditions (such as a rise in income), to use investment strategies to accumulate wealth; however, most do not actually use investment strategies to accumulate wealth once the initial conditions are met. For example, Under Accumulators of Wealth will promise to start investing once they have earned ten percent more in annual income. Unfortunately, when most receive that extra ten percent of income, there isn't an investment made. These claims and ideas usually branch off an initial belief that a lack of wealth can simply be solved by an increase in income. Even among those that do invest money, most invest only because they have an excess of income. Between 2001 and 2004, the median family income dropped 2.3% and in response, the percentage of families who owned investment stocks fell by 3.3%, showing that investments are only made in times of excess.

=== "Better Than" theory ===
The "Better Than" theory is one of the main reasons many UAWs don't hold true to their promise to invest after a rise in income. The theory is that the UAW's "necessity" for that income will also rise in response to the risen income level. According to a study conducted by Yale and stated in The Millionaire Next Door, individuals measure the level of their success through comparison to nearest neighbors and closest relatives. Therefore, as the level of income rises, so will their desire to outperform those that they compare themselves to.

=== "Better Off" theory ===
In addition to the "Better Than" theory, there is a "Better Off" theory. This theory suggests that those UAWs who grow up in a poor family and land a high-income career have a tendency to feel the need to be "better off" than their parents. To a UAW, "better off" implies a larger house, a respectable degree, a foreign luxury car, a boat, and a club membership. A hypothetical example is provided in The Millionaire Next Door to explain this concept. Teddy Friend is a typical UAW that grew up in a poor family but was still exposed to a rich lifestyle at school. He saw "rich kids" and decided that one day he would be "better off" than his poor parents. Sure enough, when Mr. Friend reached a high income level, he indulged himself in possessions. He bought a large home along with a foreign luxury car. According to most UAWs, he lives a very comfortable lifestyle. He lives a very comfortable lifestyle in terms of possessions, but in terms of financial security, Mr. Friend's lifestyle is uncomfortable.

=== Money: a renewable resource ===
Another belief that UAWs have is that "money is the most easily renewable resource". This belief usually is another leading cause for UAW's consumption and investment habits. Money is more easily spent now than it is saved. In America it is easier to generate a high income than it is to accumulate wealth.

== Spending habits ==
When it comes to spending habits, UAWs are everything but frugal. A typical UAW tends to live in luxury, style and comfort. Not all UAWs fit these characteristics. A $50,000-a-year janitor can be more of a PAW than a $700,000-a-year doctor. The spending habits that UAWs have are a direct effect of the “Better Than” theory.

=== Million dollar choices ===
Some of the financial choices that UAWs make are considered to be “million dollar choices” because if the choice hadn't been made, the UAW would have in excess of a million dollars. An example given in The Millionaire Next Door explains how small purchases of cigarettes over a long period of time can represent a large sum of money. Mr. Friend's poor parents smoked at least three packs of cigarettes a day. Three packs a day over 46 years translated into a sum of money that exceeded the value of their home by $33,000. Had the Friends invested and reinvested that money over a 46-year period, the portfolio would have exceeded $2 million. The point is made that a UAW makes choices that have a substantial effect over the long term, while having a marginal effect in the immediate future.

=== Car shopping habits ===
According to the authors, a common UAW drives a current model car, purchased new, and may have financed it on credit. PAWs rarely purchase new model cars and are less likely to own foreign or luxury vehicles. An example from the book details a UAW that spent roughly 60 hours researching, negotiating and purchasing a new car. In the end, while the car was purchased "near dealer cost," the UAW's time and money could have been more efficiently spent creating wealth rather than collecting possessions notorious for depreciating in value. The authors contrast the story with a PAW who decided that the pride of owning a brand new car wasn't worth the $20,000 price difference.

=== Investing strategies ===
Most UAWs believe in the "Better Off" theory, "Better Than" theory, or both – so they value other people knowing (or at least believing) they are wealthy right now more than maintaining and growing their wealth over the long term. Most PAWs minimize their realized income and / or taxable income, they maximize their unrealized and / or nontaxable income, or both. The strategy helps them grow wealth over the long term.

Here is one example. Buying a car (whether new or used) cannot be deducted from your taxes, but putting money into a retirement savings account can. On average, it seems that UAWs spend much more time than PAWs figuring out which car to buy. Meanwhile, UAWs are less likely than PAWs to have any retirement savings, they spend less time figuring out which tax advantaged retirement savings account to use (such as a 401(k) versus Individual Retirement Account (IRA)), and they put less money in.

Another example is related to the stock market. UAWs are less likely than PAWs to engage with the stock market at all, those who do spend less time learning about it, they spend less time evaluating their investment portfolios, they are less willing to take risks, and they are more likely to be swindled by cold callers. Twenty percent of UAWs keep most of their wealth in cash or cash-equivalent accounts, so that they can have quick access to cash when consumption habits rise. When it comes to the time it takes, common beliefs among UAWs include "I never have the time needed to make it pay off", "Our careers take up all of our time", or "I don't have 20 hours a week to fool around with money". On average, a UAW spends about nine minutes per day, one hour and three minutes per week, four hours and forty minutes per month, and fifty five hours and twelve minutes per year evaluating their investment portfolio. That is about eighty three percent less time than a PAW, which means about fifty three minutes per day, six hours and thirteen minutes per week, twenty seven hours and four minutes per month, and three hundred twenty four hours and forty two minutes per year. One example of a person who had the knowledge and ability to become a PAW through the stock market, but felt too nervous about the risk, was Mr. Willis. At the time, he had been employed as an executive at Walmart for ten years. During those ten years, the company grew enormously, and therefore stock share prices also grew enormously. However, at the beginning and middle of that time, Mr. Willis did not buy even one share to sell later. In this context, a cold caller is usually a broker who does not know much about the stock market, but targets high income households, and persuades the households to make investments with them. Doctors and lawyers are especially susceptible. A person who is not actually a UAW when they are swindled might become cynical or pessimistic about the stock market in general and thus become a UAW.

== Educational and career choices ==
Although UAWs exist in all career fields and have obtained different levels of education, some professions are more likely to lead to a UAW lifestyle. Doctors, physicians, lawyers, and dentists are among the top professions with a high UAW concentration of individuals. The individuals in these professions are twice as likely to be a UAW than a PAW. There are two reasons for these findings. First, because these professions require advanced degrees, individuals get a delayed start in the accumulation race. Most of the income during these educational pursuits is used to fund tuition, housing, and student loans rather than investment. The second reason is that American society has prescribed a lifestyle to these professions. Doctors are expected to live in an upscale neighborhood with multiple cars, a boat, and other luxury items. Their lives become a high consumption lifestyle to fulfill the “Better Than” theory.

=== Correlation between income and wealth ===
With doctors having a high propensity to be a UAW as evidence, there is an indirect relationship between the level of income an individual earns and the net wealth that one accumulates. Doctors have a reasonably high level of income; therefore, it is more likely that doctors have relatively low amounts of net worth. The same holds true for those that have lower levels of income. They are more likely to accumulate more in relation to their level of income. Of course, there are those who are an exception to the rule on both sides of the spectrum.

== Children of UAWs ==
When children are brought up in a high consumption, UAW lifestyle, they are more likely to become UAWs themselves. More often than not, the children of high income UAWs become more devout believers in the UAW system than their parents. The children grow accustomed to extreme luxury and believe that they too must possess the same luxury as their parents, even if their income is much less. It is an extreme manifestation of the “Better Off” theory. On the other hand, PAWs may also produce UAW offspring. If the Friends had invested the money they had been consuming, they would have been considered PAWs; however, the standard of living that their son, Mr. Friend, grew up in would have been diminished. Mr. Friend would have felt an even higher desire to be “better off” than his parents were. He may still have been a UAW regardless of whether his parents were UAWs or PAWs.

=== Economic Outpatient Care ===
Economic Outpatient Care (EOC) is a term used to express when an affluent parent provides money to an adult child. Besides offspring observations resulting in UAW children, EOC is a contributing factor to the passing on of the UAW belief. Adult children who receive EOC have 98% of the annual income compared to their counterparts who are not recipients of EOC. In comparison, they also have 57% of the net worth. EOC gives recipients a false sense of financial security. For this reason they purchase homes in upscale neighborhoods that exceed the recommended value according to their incomes. Thirty percent of American families live in homes valued at $300,000, yet only earn an annual income of $60,000. These homes then demand nice cars for the driveway, nice furniture for the living room, and a nice plasma TV to complement the furniture. These adult children also purchase and consume the EOC rather than invest it. If a dose of EOC is given on a regular basis, the EOC can actually be absorbed into the individual's perceived annual income. Expenditures are then calculated with the anticipation of a regularly scheduled dose of EOC.

== Criticism ==
Nassim Nicholas Taleb criticized the premise of the book on the basis of two instances of survivorship bias: that there is no mention of the accumulators who have accumulated underperforming assets, and that the United States had just gone through the greatest bull market in its history at the time of the book's publication. He suggested that the authors should lower the net worth of the observed millionaires to compensate for the effect of the unobserved losers, and to consider the fate of accumulators following prolonged periods of recession such as in 1982 or 1935.

== Related publications ==
1. Marketing to the Affluent (1988)
2. Selling to the Affluent (1991)
3. Networking with the Affluent (1993)
4. The Millionaire Next Door (1996, 2010)
5. The Millionaire Mind (2000)
6. Millionaire Women Next Door (2004)
7. Stop Acting Rich (2009)

== See also ==
- FIRE movement
- List of electronic trading platforms
