= Thomas J. Stanley =

American writer (1944–2015)

- Died: February 28, 2015 near Marietta, Georgia, U.S.
- Occupations: Writer, marketing professor, business theorist
- Writing career
- Notable works: The Millionaire Next Door (1996); The Millionaire Mind

Thomas J. Stanley (1944 – February 28, 2015) was an American writer and business theorist. He was the author and co-author of several award-winning books on America's wealthy, including the New York Times’ best sellers The Millionaire Next Door and The Millionaire Mind. He served as chief advisor to Data Points, a company founded based on his research and data. He received a doctorate in business administration from the University of Georgia. He was on the faculty of the University at Albany, State University of New York. He taught marketing at the University of Tennessee, University of Georgia and Georgia State University (where he was named Omicron Delta Kappa's Outstanding Professor).

Thomas Stanley was born in the Bronx in 1944. His father worked as a subway car driver, while his mother was a homemaker and secretary. He attended college in Connecticut, doing graduate work at the University of Tennessee. He earned a doctorate at the University of Georgia, and eventually moved to the Atlanta area to teach at Georgia State University. Stanley spent most of his career studying how the financially successful Americans in a wide range of professions and with a varying level of income acquired their wealth on their own. In 2015 he was killed by a drunk driver at the age of 71. During his last days, he was working on a book with his daughter, an industrial psychologist, who later finished it. The book is called The Next Millionaire Next Door: Enduring Strategies for Building Wealth, and attributes authorship to Thomas J. Stanley and his daughter, Sarah Stanley Fallaw.

== Books ==
- Marketing to the Affluent, McGraw-Hill, 1988, ISBN 0-07-061047-9
- Selling to the Affluent, McGraw-Hill, 1991, ISBN 0-07-061049-5
- Networking with the Affluent and Their Advisors, McGraw-Hill, 1993, ISBN 0-07-061048-7
- The Millionaire Next Door, Longstreet Press, 1996, ISBN 978-1-56352-330-4
- The Millionaire Mind, Andrews McMeel Publishing, LLC, 2000 ISBN 0-7407-1858-4
- Millionaire Women Next Door, Andrews McMeel Publishing, LLC, 2004, ISBN 0-7407-4532-8
- Stop Acting Rich: And Start Living Like A Real Millionaire, John Wiley & Sons, Inc, 2009, ISBN 0-470-48255-9

== Significant articles ==
- "America's Affluent", American Demographics 1984
- "Investment Management and the Affluent Customer", The Bankers Magazine 1984
- "The Response of Affluent Consumers to Mail Surveys", Journal of Advertising Research 1986
- "How to Network with Affluent Client Prospects", Marketing for Lawyers 1993
- "How to Live Like a Millionaire", Reader's Digest, originally published as "Why You're Not as Wealthy as You Should Be", 1993
- "Ways to Add Value for Clients", Journal of Accountancy 1994
- "The Doctor who Manages his Own Investments Has a Fool for a Client", Medical Economics 2000
